= National service in the United States =

National service in the United States has a long tradition, extending to the founding of the country. National service takes multiple forms in the U.S., including community service, military service, and other forms.

== Military national service ==
Thomas Jefferson lobbied heavily to ban a professional, standing army, and pushed for the creation of a universal and classified militia system that obligated every physically capable male to render service. Though he failed to have such a clause written into the U.S. Constitution or Bill of Rights, Jefferson continued to push for a universal and classified militia until his death in 1826.

But it proves more forcibly the necessity of obliging every citizen to be a soldier; this was the case with the Greeks and Romans, and must be that of every free State. Where there is no oppression there will be no pauper hirelings.

— Thomas Jefferson, in an 1813 letter to James Monroe

We must train and classify the whole of our male citizens, and make military instruction a regular part of collegiate education. We can never be safe till this is done.

— Thomas Jefferson, June 18, 1813 in a letter to James Monroe

The Greeks by their laws, and the Romans by the spirit of their people, took care to put into the hands of their rulers no such engine of oppression as a standing army. Their system was to make every man a soldier, and oblige him to repair to the standard of his country whenever that was reared. This made them invincible; and the same remedy will make us so.

— Thomas Jefferson, September 10, 1814 in a letter to Thomas Cooper

Led by James Madison and Alexander Hamilton, the Federalists believed that a professional, standing army under the control of the federal government was necessary.

If we mean to be a commercial people, or even to be secure on our Atlantic side, we must endeavor, as soon as possible, to have a navy. To this purpose there must be dock-yards and arsenals; and for the defense of these, fortifications, and probably garrisons

— Alexander Hamilton, Federalist No. 24

...To oblige the great body of the yeomanry and of the other classes of citizens to be under arms for the purpose of going through military exercises and evolutions, as often as might be necessary to acquire the degree of perfection which would entitle them to the character of a well-regulated militia, would be a real grievance to the people and a serious public inconvenience and loss. It would form an annual deduction from the productive labor of this country to an amount which, calculating upon the present numbers of the people, would not fall far short of a million pounds. To attempt a thing which would abridge the mass of labor and industry to so considerable extent would be unwise: and the experiment, if made, could not succeed, because it would not long be endured. Little more can reasonably be aimed at with respect to the people at large than to have them properly armed and equipped; and in order to see that this be not neglected, it will be necessary to assemble them once or twice in the course of a year. But through the scheme of disciplining the whole nation must be abandoned as mischievous or impracticable; yet it is a matter of the utmost importance that a well-digested plan should, as soon as possible, be adopted for the proper establishment of the militia. The attention of the government ought particularly to be directed to the formation of a select corps of moderate size, upon such principles as will really fit it for service in case of need. By thus circumscribing the plan, it will be possible to have an excellent body of well-trained militia ready to take the field whenever the defense of the state shall require it. This will not only lessen the call for military establishments, but if circumstances should at any time oblige the government to form an army of any magnitude that army can never be formidable to the liberties of the people while there is a large body of citizens, little if at all inferior to them in discipline and the use of arms, who stand ready to defend their own rights and those of their fellow citizens. This appears to me the only substitute that can be devised for a standing army, and the best possible security against it, if it should exist.

— Alexander Hamilton, James Madison, and John Jay, Federalist No. 29

Let a regular army, fully equal to the resources of the country, be formed; and let it be entirely at the devotion of the federal government; still it would not be going too far to say, that the State governments, with the people on their side, would be able to repel the danger. The highest number to which, according to the best computation, a standing army can be carried in any country, does not exceed one hundredth of the whole number of souls; or one twenty-fifth part of the number able to bear arms. This proportion would not yield, in the United States, an army of more than twenty-five or thirty thousand men. To these would be opposed a militia amounting to near half a million of citizens with arms in their hands, officered by men chosen from among themselves, fighting for their common liberties, and united and conducted by governments possessing their affections and confidence. It may well be doubted, whether a militia thus circumstanced could ever be conquered by such a proportion of regular troops.

— James Madison, Federalist No. 46

The Federalists won the debate, in part because of circumstances beyond their control. The first of these circumstances was Shays' Rebellion. The uprising was triggered by veterans of the American Revolutionary War who were losing their farms to unscrupulous lenders and regressive taxes in Massachusetts that heavily burdened small farmers to repay the war debt from the very war they fought in. Individuals unable to pay were often thrown into debtors' prisons. The various local militias that comprised Shay's "Regulators" went from town to town, shutting down Debtor's Courts and tax collection. They were eventually defeated by 4,400 mercenaries hired by Governor James Bowdoin in cooperation with Boston financiers. The political spin from the incident was that militias could not be relied upon and controlled, despite the exceptional circumstances that caused some of the Massachusetts militiamen to rebel in the first place.

The second circumstance was the Battle of the Wabash (Fort Recovery, Ohio) in the Northwest Indian War in 1791. A force of 1,000 Miamis, Shawnees, Buckongahelas, and Delawares massacred a militia-heavy US Army under the control of General Arthur St. Clair. The Native Americans inflicted a 97% casualty rate on St. Clair's force, making it one of the worst losses in US military history. In response, President George Washington and Congress raised the Legion of the United States, a professional combined-arms brigade of cavalry, artillery, and infantry under the control of one of Washington's old subordinates, General "Mad" Anthony Wayne. The Legion defeated the Western Confederacy at the Battle of Fallen Timbers in 1794, thus affirming the place for a federally controlled, standing army in the new country, ostensibly to fight Native Americans on the Frontier.

The door was closed on the issue with the Militia Act of 1792. The 1792 Act codified the responsibility of all Americans in providing for the Nation's defense and mandated that every physically capable male between the ages of 18 and 45 be available for military service. The 1792 Act did not classify the militia (set service requirements according to age, i.e., 18- to 21-year-olds perform active service, 21 years and up perform voluntary or contingency service), or make the provision for select units (active-duty units that might serve alongside the regular Army), or provide uniform and detailed regulation throughout the States. Lastly, it did not provide financial ways and means to bring a National Militia into being.

In essence, the Militia Act of 1792 was a compromise between all parties. The Federalists would not have to pay for the militia, which was always a concern. Also, many of the Anti-Federalists did not want the Federal Government meddling in the regulation of their states' militias. They regarded it as an improper extension of federal power.

Washington and Jefferson remained skeptical. Both wanted a classified or select militia, and they predicted the inadequate results of the 1792 Act. In 1805, Jefferson attempted to improve the system as President, but his efforts did not gain the support of Congress. In many states, the militias gradually devolved until existing almost exclusively on paper by the 1840s.

=== The creation of the federal draft ===
During the War of 1812, President James Madison and United States Secretary of War James Monroe sought a military draft, but Congress vehemently opposed it. Conscription continued to remain the domain of the States through levies to form militias. The federal draft was first applied in the American Civil War, though on a very limited basis with only 2% of the Union Army being draftees. It was reinstated again for World War I with the Selective Service Act of 1917.

=== Creation of the National Guard ===
After witnessing numerous problems with the Militia during the Spanish–American War, President Theodore Roosevelt's Secretary of War, Elihu Root, pushed for a reformation of the old Militia System into a dedicated National Guard Bureau within the United States Department of War. The resulting Militia Act of 1903 (also known as the Dick Act due to it sponsorship by Senator Charles Dick from Ohio), classified all American males between the ages of 17 and 45 as either part of the organized militia (the National Guard), or a member of the unorganized militia (all males within the age range who are not members of the National Guard).

On June 3, 1916, President Woodrow Wilson signed into law the National Defense Act of 1916. The 1916 Defense Act increased the size and scope of the National Guard and created the Junior ROTC and ROTC (Reserve Officer Training Corps) for high schools and college campuses.

=== World War II ===
With the anticipation of war in Europe, Congress passed the Selective Training and Service Act of 1940 (Burke–Wadsworth Act). The 1940 Selective Service Act was significant because it was the first time in US History that conscription was enacted in peacetime, in spite of opposition from religious groups. The Act also contained a provision allowing for conscientious objection. This clause was a distinct departure from the World War I era when many Conscientious Objectors were jailed. Under the 1940 Act, all males between the ages of 21 and 35 were required to register, with draftees being selected via lottery. Draftees were to serve for no more than 12 months, and their service was to be limited to the US or US territories only. The 1940 draft was not a popular program, but public sentiment changed with the bombing of Pearl Harbor in 1941. To further conscription during the War, the draft age was lowered to 18.

During World War II, US participation was invoked at virtually every level of American society. Over 16 million men and women served in uniform, over 12% of a population of 130 million. Additionally, over 400,000 gave their lives; the largest sacrifice in any American war with the exception of the Civil War.

=== Post World War II: the question of universal military training ===
The downsizing of the US military after World War II, without proper regard to future threats, left America's forces ill-trained and poorly manned and equipped for the Korean War. Following World War II, US Army end strength dropped from 8 million in the spring of 1945 to 684,000 by 1 July 1947, a reduction of 89 divisions to 12. Over the next year it was reduced again from 12 to 10. Spurred by tremendous public pressure to "bring the boys home," Congress had little interest in considerations for future conflicts. Besides, with the advent of the nuclear era, it was believed that all future wars would be fought with airplanes and atom bombs. Demobilization, in turn, was conducted without much forethought to its effects on readiness. In Germany, as veteran American units were disintegrated, the remnants were rolled up into the ad hoc United States Constabulary. In Japan, the 1st Cavalry Division was at 25% manning its first year of occupation duty, with minimally trained teenagers as its only replacements. The Army had dropped its basic training requirement from 13 weeks to eight, and in November and December 1946 only four weeks were required. By 1950, the four divisions that remained in Japan were at 48.8% strength, with their combat service support units only at 25.9%. Lastly, of the three divisions sent to Korea in 1945 to prevent Soviet incursion there, two were deactivated and the third sent to Japan in 1948. These forces were further derelict in the absence of logistics and combat training. Between 1945 and 1950, the Army procured nothing except food, clothing, and medical supplies. No new weapons, vehicles, equipment, spare parts, or ammunition was thought necessary. Combat training was equally nonexistent.

Immediately following the end of World War II, General Jacob Devers, Chief of Army Field Forces, suspended all unit live-fire training even though the Army had a well-developed, wartime tested series of live fire exercises for squads, platoons, and companies. His rationale, and that of his successor, General Mark Clark, was simple: safety. Safety was a greater concern to the Army's peacetime leaders than training readiness.

To offset the rapid disintegration of the Army, General George C. Marshall hoped President Harry S. Truman and Congress would enact Universal Military Training (UMT), requiring all young men to receive one year of military training so the Army could expediently ramp up in time of war. This never happened, but when Army end-strength fell to a dismal 538,000 soldiers in June 1948, Congress begrudgingly passed the Selective Service Act of 1948. Budget conflicts, though, resulted in adding only 100,000 new soldiers. Nuclear deterrence aside, The United States' occupation of Germany and Japan during this time was made possible by the absence of any insurgency, or a Soviet invasion.

General Marshall ordered the War Department to produce a Universal Military Service pamphlet in 1944. General Marshall's staff considered the pamphlet too controversial, so it was never disseminated. The pamphlet survived only in the archives at the Library of Congress.

Despite General Marshall's unsuccessful promotion of Universal Military Training immediately following World War II, he would get another opportunity when he became the 3rd Secretary of Defense in September 1950. In the summer of 1950, the initial actions of the Korean War (including Task Force Smith) painfully demonstrated the US military's lack of preparedness. In response, US military end-strength was increased from 1,460,000 to 3,250,000 by the summer of 1951. Though the immediate problem was addressed, Marshall sought a permanent solution for national defense, and pushed strenuously for UMT. President Truman had been considering such a program for several years. Their combined efforts resulted in the Universal Military Training and Service Act of 1951.

The Universal Military Training and Service Act of 1951 set the statutory terms of service for the military at a minimum of 8 years, lowered the draft age from 19 to 18½, increased active-duty service time from 21 to 24 months, and contained a provision obligating all young American males to UMT. There was one catch in the legislation though. The UMT clause had to be activated by further legislation for it to go into effect. Despite successive attempts over the next several years, such legislation was never passed.

President Eisenhower took office in 1953 and ended hostilities in the Korean War. The Army and Marine infantries decreased in size. Eisenhower's "New Look" defense policy shifted back to a reliance on airplanes and atom bombs, thus further decreasing the possibility of universal military service.

=== The Vietnam War ===
The Vietnam War significantly reduced America's desire for conscription. The 'search and destroy' approach to counter-insurgency degraded the fighting to virtual attrition warfare. In turn, soldiers were placed in exceedingly difficult circumstances that maximized hazards and multiplied provocations for misconduct and breaks in discipline. Seeking to insulate future military operations from the ups and downs of American civilian control of the military, military leaders looked to examples like the Israeli 1967 Six-Day War as proof that all future conflicts would move so fast that there would be no time to train conscripts. Combined with the gaining influence of the Military-Industrial Complex, the country was gradually sold on the virtues of a technologically driven, professional military. In 1973, President Richard Nixon allowed the draft to expire, and the all-volunteer force was born.

In 1974, President Gerald Ford granted amnesty to all draft evaders, and terminated the Selective Service Act (started in 1917) with Proclamation 4360, March 25, 1975.

=== The Selective Service System ===
President Jimmy Carter reinstated the Selective Service System with Proclamation 4771, July 2, 1980. According to current Selective Service regulations, all American males between the ages of 18 and 26 are eligible for service. Failure to register within 30 days of a person's 18th birthday may result in five years imprisonment or a $250,000 fine.

== Non-military national service ==
The Great Depression and World War II created the modern, American ethos for national service. First, the challenges of the Great Depression brought about large-scale, government-sponsored work programs to help rehabilitate the economy. The Federal Emergency Relief Administration, Civilian Conservation Corps, Public Works Administration, Works Progress Administration, and other agencies provided employment opportunities for millions of unemployed Americans while they performed a type of National Service. The results of these programs created most of America's modern infrastructure.

Those Americans not involved in the fighting during World War II made direct contributions in other ways: rationing, price controls, purchasing war bonds, civil defense, and working in war industries. The War Production Board, War Manpower Commission, Office of Price Administration, Office of War Mobilization and other agencies were created to support the war effort.

=== The early 1960s ===
In 1961, President John F. Kennedy established the Peace Corps to provide assistance to developing nations. President Kennedy stated, "The wisdom of this idea is that someday we'll bring it home to America." Since that time, over 235,000 Americans have worked in 141 countries.

In 1964, President Lyndon B. Johnson created VISTA (Volunteers in Service to America), to assist in the War on Poverty. VISTA originally included the National Teacher Corps, the Job Corps, and the University Year of Action. The organization is now a part of AmeriCorps.

=== The advent of the Corporation for National and Community Service ===
In 1988, social entrepreneurs Alan Khazei and Michael Brown formed City Year in Boston. City Year enlists high school and college graduates to perform a year of community service and tutoring in K-12 schools. City Year became the model for AmeriCorps.

In September 1993, President Bill Clinton signed the National and Community Service Trust Act of 1993, creating AmeriCorps and the Corporation for National and Community Service. AmeriCorps provides volunteers opportunities in non-profit organizations including JumpStart, Habitat for Humanity, and Big Brothers Big Sisters of America. Over two million Americans provide community service each year through AmeriCorps and its sister programs, Senior Corps, National Civilian Community Corps, Learn and Serve America, and the USA Freedom Corps under the direction of the Corporation for National and Community Service.

=== Post 9/11 ===
After 9/11, a variety of programs were initiated to encourage Americans to serve. President George W. Bush initiated the U.S.A. Freedom Corps within months of the attacks. On January 7, 2003, Senator Ernest F. Hollings (South Carolina) and Representative Charles Rangel (New York) introduced the Universal National Service Act of 2003 (S. 89 / H.R. 163). H.R. 163 failed in the United States House of Representatives by a vote of 2–402 on October 5, 2004. On February 14, 2006, Rangel introduced the Universal National Service Act of 2006 (H.R. 4752), but the bill never made it out of committee. On January 10, 2007, Rangel introduced the Universal National Service Act of 2007 (H.R. 393), but the bill never made it out of committee again. On September 10, 2007, Time Magazine published a full issue dedicated to promoting National Service, signaling the beginning of a new public debate on the issue.

In January 2008, various military, civic, education, and social justice leaders, including R. Sargent Shriver (founder of the Peace Corps), Alan Khazei and Michael Brown (founders of City Year), and Shirley Sagawa (1st Director of AmeriCorps), in conjunction with 106 private organizations, started the Service Nation Campaign. The stated goal of the campaign is to significantly increase voluntary national service in the United States.

On July 21, 2008, John McCain announced he would speak at the Service Nation Summit on service in a presidential candidate forum.

On January 1, 2016, Service Year Alliance was created through the merger of ServiceNation, the Franklin Project at the Aspen Institute, and the Service Year Exchange project of the National Conference on Citizenship. Its mission is to make a year of service a common opportunity and expectation for young Americans.

On 1 October 2016, Hillary Clinton announced in her campaign speech her plan for a "National Service Reserve", which would be a reserve corps for AmeriCorps, Peace Corps and other branches of the CNCS.

In the 2020 Democratic Party presidential primaries John Delaney proposed a mandatory year of national service for 18-year-olds, which would either consist of military service, community service, or a membership in the National Infrastructure Apprenticeship or Climate Corps. Other Democratic presidential candidates favored expansion of voluntary national service programs: Pete Buttigieg proposed expanded national service, Elizabeth Warren proposed a 10,000-member Civilian Conservation Corps, and Kirsten Gillibrand proposed free tuition for participants in national service programs.

== See also ==
- Alternative service
- Civil conscription
- Conscription in the United States
- Service Nation
- Greatest Generation
