= Aspen Ideas Festival =

Organization

- Abbreviation: AIF
- Formation: 2005; 21 years ago
- Type: Academic conference
- Location: Aspen, Colorado, U.S.
- Key people: Dan Porterfield
- Website: aspenideas.org

Founded in 2005, the Aspen Ideas Festival (AIF) is a week-long event held in Aspen, Colorado, United States. The Aspen Ideas Festival program of events includes discussions, seminars, panels, and tutorials from journalists, designers, innovators, politicians, diplomats, presidents, judges, musicians, artists, and writers.

The Aspen Ideas Festival is a program of the Aspen Institute. The AIF format is modeled after educational seminars. Topics covered during the festival include global politics and economics, U.S. policy, the environment, technology, science, health, education, the arts, and economic issues.

During the festival, live streaming of AIF events is available through the AIF website, The Atlantic, and National Public Radio. Videos and sound clips from past AIF events are archived on the AIF website.

Past AIF speakers include President Bill Clinton, Bill Gates, Ehud Barak, Madeleine Albright, Murray Gell-Mann, Sylvia Earle, Stephen Breyer, Sandra Day O'Connor, Eric Holder, Hillary Clinton, Ruth Bader Ginsburg, David Frum, Salam Fayyad, and Paul Ryan.

== Background ==
=== History ===
The first Aspen Ideas Festival took place in Aspen, Colorado in 2005. The Aspen Institute, under the leadership of Walter Isaacson and Elliot Gerson, developed the Aspen Ideas Festival to gather individuals from various backgrounds and fields of expertise for discussions about global and social issues and innovative ideas. At the first Aspen Ideas Festival in 2005, around 100 speakers attended the festival, among them Jane Goodall, Toni Morrison, Jim Lehrer, Arthur Schlesinger, and many others. The Aspen Ideas Festival modeled its programming for the first festival from some of the Aspen Institute's earliest events, such as the Goethe Bicentennial in 1949.

=== The Aspen Institute ===
The Aspen Institute was founded by Walter Paepcke in 1950 in Aspen, Colorado. Paepcke was a Chicago businessman and the founder of the Container Corporation of American (CCA). As a Germanophile, he and his wife, Elizabeth Paepcke, actualized a celebration and gathering in Aspen in June 1949 to mark the two-hundredth birthday of Johann Wolfgang von Goethe. From the success of the Goethe Bicentennial Festival came the Aspen Institute for Humanistic Studies. Under Paepcke, the Aspen Institute's programs explored a range of topics through lectures and discussions with top thinkers in a variety of fields from science to the arts.

Now based in Washington, D.C., with a campus in Aspen, the Aspen Institute hosts programs focused on discussion of education and policy issues where presidents, scientists, artists, ambassadors, Nobel laureates, and many others have been in attendance.

== Speakers ==
Since its inception in 2005, Aspen Ideas Festival speakers have included individuals from a wide range of backgrounds, including politicians, diplomats, presidents, judges, scientists, musicians, entrepreneurs, artists, designers and innovators. AIF speakers have participated in discussions and AIF programs for the purpose of sharing their knowledge on subjects related to their expertise, interests, and field of work. These discussions have ranged from the global economy to the environment to theatrical performances and beyond. Past speakers include Hillary Clinton, Mitt Romney, Sandra Day O'Connor, Barbra Streisand, and Joe Biden.

During the 2013 Aspen Ideas Festival, Supreme Court Justice Stephen Breyer discussed recent Supreme Court rulings, including those on the Defense of Marriage Act and the Voting Rights Act, as well as public response following court decisions in the United States and around the world. Renowned Oceanographer, Sylvia Earle, spoke during the 2010 Aspen Ideas Festival about women's issues and education. Earle touched upon the impact of societal pressures on the interest girls and young women take in science and becoming high achievers. Former President Bill Clinton spoke during the 2007 Aspen Ideas Festival, telling the audience about the urgency of accepting globalization and the global world by working interdependently with other cultures and countries for the purpose of achieving cultural understanding and harmonious cross-cultural relationships.

== Scholars ==
=== Aspen Ideas Festival Scholars ===
The Aspen Ideas Festival Scholars program nominates individuals from all over the world for their unique accomplishments and dedication to improving their communities and making advances in their field of work. Aspen Institute trustees, Aspen Institute senior staff, Aspen Ideas Festival advisors, and past Aspen Ideas Festival scholars select the incoming group of scholars each year. Past Aspen Ideas Festival Scholars include educators, journalists, politicians, writers, and community organizers.

=== Bezos Scholars ===
Part of the Aspen Ideas Festival since 2005, the Bezos Scholars program invites twelve public high school students in the eleventh grade and twelve educators to attend the Aspen Ideas Festival. The Bezos Scholars attend Aspen Ideas Festival programs and events, as well as discussions and engagements designed only for Bezos Scholars. After attending the Aspen Ideas Festival, the Scholars return to their hometowns in order to produce a localized version of the Aspen Ideas Festival, a Local Ideas Festivals, inspired by their experiences in Aspen.

== Impacts ==
In 2012, Stanley McChrystal was interviewed by Bob Schieffer at the festival. As part of that interview, McChrystal was asked whether or not he believed in the draft. He responded that he thought every young person should serve, but the military doesn't need every young person, so we need to create more opportunities for all young Americans to serve. The Franklin Project—an initiative to make a year of national service a common opportunity and expectation for young Americans—was created as a result of this festival conversation. Walter Isaacson called the Franklin Project the “biggest idea” to come out of the festival during his tenure as CEO of the Aspen Institute.
