= ServiceNation =

Campaign advocating national service in the United States

ServiceNation was a campaign of Be The Change, Inc., a 501(c)(3) organization based in Boston, Massachusetts. Its mission was to rekindle an ethic of civic responsibility in America through universal national service. ServiceNation's goal was to expand opportunities for Americans to spend a year in non-military national service such as AmeriCorps. National service programs like Americorps pay a living stipend and reward volunteers who have completed service with a monetary education award.

In January 2016, ServiceNation merged with the Franklin Project at the Aspen Institute and the Service Year Exchange (which was incubated at the National Conference on Citizenship) to form the Service Year Alliance.

== History ==
ServiceNation was founded as a campaign of Be The Change, Inc. Be The Change creates national issue-based campaigns that work to solve society's greatest challenges and change the world. It has two main campaigns: ServiceNation and Opportunity Nation. Both are driven by broad cross-partisan coalitions that inspire culture change and accelerate public policy development to bring about positive changes in our society.

=== Serve A Year Campaign ===
On March 23, 2015, in front of a crowd of 200 Hollywood executives, writers and producers, Chelsea Clinton and Jimmy Kimmel teamed up with ServiceNation to unveil an initiative aimed at convincing the youth of America to spend a year after high school or college serving in their communities through programs like AmeriCorps, a domestic version of the Peace Corps.

=== ServiceNation Summit ===
In 2008, Be The Change, Inc. partnered with Points of Light Institute, Civic Enterprises, and City Year to host a bipartisan summit on national service and civic engagement and was underwritten by AARP, the Carnegie Corporation of New York, Target Corporation, and Time magazine. ServiceNation was launched at the summit, called the ServiceNation Presidential Candidates Forum and Summit, held on September 11–12, 2008 at Columbia University in New York City.

The Summit honored and featured the coalition of more than 300 organizations that support the vision of expanding national service opportunities. Notable attendees included: New York City mayor Michael Bloomberg, then-California Governor Arnold Schwarzenegger, then-Senator Hillary Clinton, Martin Luther King III, Robert F. Kennedy Jr, Queen Noor of Jordan, Caroline Kennedy, Wendy Kopp, Admiral Mike Mullen, then-Florida Governor Charlie Crist, and many others.

The main event was a forum attended by both 2008 presidential candidates, Senator John McCain and then-Senator Barack Obama, moderated by Richard Stengel, managing editor of Time magazine, with PBS NewsHour anchor Judy Woodruff. New York's governor at the time, David Paterson, welcomed the audience. The forum showcased both candidates’ views on national service and civic engagement. McCain highlighted the public-private partnerships such as Teach For America that have been successful while Obama emphasized the importance of young people being part of something larger than themselves.

At the Summit, Senator Orrin Hatch (R-UT) and Caroline Kennedy, speaking on behalf of her uncle, Senator Ted Kennedy (D-MA) proposed legislation for expanding national service in America. Co-sponsored by Senators Hatch and Kennedy, the Edward M. Kennedy Serve America Act passed within the first 100 days of President Barack Obama's first term on April 21, 2009. ServiceNation was a strong advocate for the Edward M. Kennedy Serve America Act, which sanctions a significant increase in federal funding for nationwide service programs such as AmeriCorps. This legislation was passed with bipartisan support by the Senate and House on March 30, 2009. It expanded national service, pledging to increase the number of AmeriCorps members to 250,000 by 2017, among other provisions. ServiceNation played a leading role in drafting and advocating for the passage of this legislation. At the summit, Senator Chris Dodd also unveiled two bills to promote community service among high school students and seniors.

After the summit, ServiceNation planned a Day of Action for September 27 during which organizers across the nation planned more than 2,300 activities. The Day of Action focused on people signing a Declaration of Service pledging to complete 50 hours of service in the next year.

=== Civilian military initiative ===
On Veteran's Day, November 11, 2009, ServiceNation launched a civilian-military initiative called Mission Serve to connect civilian and military communities through shared service and volunteerism. The Veteran's Day event was kicked off with First Lady Michelle Obama, Jill Biden, and Mrs. Alma Powell. Mission Serve launched with 36 newly formed civilian-military partnerships.

From 2009 to 2011, Mission Serve organized annual service events across the country on Veteran's Day that united civilian and military communities through service projects. In 2011, notable participants included General Stanley A. McChrystal, Senator Lisa Murkowski, Yankees manager Joe Girardi, the cast of Hawaii Five-0, Brandon Routh, Megan Fox, Laird Hamilton, Gabby Reece, and many others. The centerpiece of the day was veterans and military families working with civilians to help other veterans in order to empower veterans.

In 2011, Be the Change and ServiceNation convened major Hollywood studios, networks, talent agencies, and guilds in the entertainment industry for a yearlong discussion of veteran's issues. The result was the industry signing on to an awareness and activation campaign called Got Your 6 to change the conversation about veterans and military families. The Mission Serve initiative evolved into this campaign and became Got Your 6.

=== Merger ===
In early 2012, ServeNext, a nonprofit launched in 2007 to advocate for national service programs like AmeriCorps through grassroots advocacy joined the umbrella of ServiceNation initiatives.

== Leadership ==
- Zach Maurin - Executive Director of ServiceNation
- Alan Khazei - CEO of Be The Change, Inc.
- Rob Gordon - President of Be The Change, Inc.

== Current priorities ==
As of April 2013, ServiceNation is pursuing several priorities: expanding national service, amending the GI Bill, and increasing awareness about national service in America.

In partnership with its sister campaign, Got Your 6, ServiceNation works to promote expansion of opportunities for veterans to continue to serve the nation. More than one million military service members will return to civilian life in the next five years and most are eligible for GI Bill benefits. However, only 36% use their benefits. Introducing the option of using part of GI Bill benefits to spend a year in service to the country will provide transition time as well as a pathway to education and jobs.

ServiceNation also pursues expanding national service opportunities through grassroots advocacy. Full-time field organizers and volunteer district captains engage key supporters in targeted local areas to build support for national service. These organizers and District Captains work with elected officials, the media, key decision makers, nonprofit partners, AmeriCorps Alums, and others to help educate about the value of national service.

== ServiceNation Coalition ==
Since 2008, the ServiceNation Coalition has united organizations across the country that support universal national service and commit to using grassroots action to let elected officials and the nation's leaders know. More than 300 organizations are currently part of the coalition including national organizations and local affiliates.

== Criticism ==
ServiceNation has been criticized by libertarians, National Review Editor Jonah Goldberg, and the John Birch Society.

== Candidates Presidential Forum ==
Interviewers: Judy Woodruff, PBS Richard Stengel, Time magazine
- Date: September 11, 2008
- Location: Columbia University New York City
- Participants: John McCain, Barack Obama Republican and Democratic; Party Nominees

=== Underwriter ===
Carnegie Corporation

=== Presenters ===
- Time (magazine)
- AARP
- Target

=== Co-sponsors ===
- Home Depot
- Peter G. Peterson Foundation

=== Participating sponsors ===
- Case Foundation
- Illumination Fund
- Bank of America
- Charina Endowment Fund

=== Media sponsor ===
- The NonProfit Times

=== Lead Social Media Partner ===
- Facebook

=== Organizers ===
- Be the Change, Inc.
- City Year
- Civic Enterprise, LLC
- Points of Light Institute

=== Co-chairs ===
- Vartan Gregorian, president, Carnegie Corporation of New York
- Caroline Kennedy, vice-chair, New York City Fund For Public Schools
- Bill Novelli, CEO, AARP
- Alma Powell, chair, America's Promise Alliance
- Rick Stengel, managing editor, TIME magazine

=== Council ===
- Andi Bernstein
- Tom A. Bernstein, president and co-founder, Chelsea Piers
- Michael R. Bloomberg, mayor, New York, NY; chairman, National September 11 Memorial and Museum
- Cory Booker, mayor, Newark, NJ
- Richard H. Brodhead, president, Duke University
- Neil Bush, CEO, Global XS
- Geoffrey Canada, president and CEO, Harlem Children's Zone
- Mortimer Caplin, former commissioner, Internal Revenue Service
- Vice Admiral Richard Carmona, former U.S. Surgeon General
- Jean Case, CEO, The Case Foundation
- Richard Celeste, president, Colorado College
- Ray Chambers, Amelior Foundation
- Richard Cizik, vice president, National Association of Evangelicals
- Henry Cisneros, chairman, CityView; former U.S. Secretary of Housing and Urban Development
- Glenn Close, actress
- William Cohen, former Secretary of Defense; former U.S. Senator
- Janet Langhart Cohen, author; founder, Citizen Patriot Organization
- Scott Cowen, president, Tulane University
- Tom Daschle, former U.S. Senator
- John J. DeGioia, president, Georgetown University
- Manny Diaz, mayor, Miami, FL
- John DiIulio, former director, Office of Faith*Based and Community Initiatives; author, The Godly Republic
- Melinda Doolittle, recording artist
- Paul Fireman, founder, Reebok
- Al From, founder and CEO, Democratic Leadership Council
- Susan Fuhrman, president, Teachers College, Columbia University
- Mark Gearan, president, Hobart and William Smith Colleges
- David Gergen, professor of public service and director, Center for Public Leadership, Harvard University
- Michael Gerson, columnist, The Washington Post
- Stephen Goldsmith, former mayor, Indianapolis, IN
- Robert L. Gordon III, former Deputy Under Secretary of Defense, Military Community and Family Policy
- Jennifer Granholm, governor, Michigan
- Rabbi Irving Greenberg, theologian; author, The Jewish Way; Founding President, Jewish Life Network
- Amy Gutmann, president, University of Pennsylvania
- Lee H. Hamilton, former Congressman; former co-chair, 9/11 Commission and Iraq Study Group
- Jenny Chin Hansen, president, AARP
- Gary Hart, former U.S. Senator
- Mellody Hobson, president, Ariel Investments
- Admiral James R. Hogg, USN (Ret), director, Strategic Studies Group, Naval War College
- James J. Jensen
- Martin Luther King, III, chairman, Realizing the Dream
- Joel Klein, chancellor, New York City Public Schools
- Sherry Lansing, founder, The Sherry Lansing Foundation
- Jim Leach, former Congressman; John L. Weinberg Professor of Public and International Affairs, Woodrow Wilson School, Princeton University
- Anthony Marx, president, Amherst College
- Bonnie McElveen-Hunter, chairman, American Red Cross
- Sam Nunn, former U.S. Senator
- Michael Nutter, mayor, Philadelphia, PA
- Martin O'Malley, governor, Maryland
- Bette Midler, founder, New York Restoration Project; Performance Artist
- Lt. General Dave Richard Palmer, USA (Ret), former superintendent, U.S. Military Academy at West Point; author
- David Paterson, governor, New York
- Kal Penn, actor
- Gregg Petersmeyer, former assistant to the president; director, Office of National Service under George H.W. Bush
- Peter G. Peterson, chairman, Peter G. Peterson Foundation; co-founder, Blackstone Group Management
- Rob Portman, former Congressman; former director, Office of Management and Budget
- Samantha Power, Anna Lindh Professor of Practice of Global Leadership and Public Policy, Harvard University; author
- Marc Racicot, former governor, Montana
- Susan Rice, foreign policy advisor, Obama for America
- Bill Richardson, governor, New Mexico
- David Shaw, managing partner, Black Point Group
- Rodney Slater, former secretary of Transportation; chair, United Way of America
- Laurie M. Tisch, president, Laurie M. Tisch Illumination Fund
- Paul Vallas, superintendent, New Orleans Recovery School District
- David Walker, president and CEO, Peter G. Peterson Foundation
- Silda Wall, founder, Children For Children
- Rick Warren, senior pastor, Saddleback Church; author, A Purpose Driven Life
- Harris Wofford, former U.S. Senator; former CEO, Corporation for National & Community Service

=== See also ===
- Global Youth Service Day
- Good Deeds Day
- International Volunteer Day
- International Year of Volunteers
- Martin Luther King Jr. Day
- Mitzvah Day
- National Philanthropy Day (U.S. and Canada)
- Random Acts of Kindness Day
- Sewa Day
- Education and Sharing Day
- Make A Difference Day
- World Kindness Day
