= National Conference on Citizenship =

Organization

- Founded: 1946
- Purpose: Civic engagement, citizenship
- Location: Washington, DC, USA
- Key people: Sterling Speirn, CEO
- Employees: 5–10
- Website: ncoc.org

The National Conference on Citizenship (NCoC) is a non-partisan, non-profit organization dedicated to strengthening civic life in America. They pursue their mission through a nationwide network of partners involved in a Civic Health Initiative, annual cross-sector conferences, and engagement with a broad spectrum of individuals and organizations interested in utilizing civic engagement principles and practices to enhance their work. Connecting people for the purpose of strengthening civic life is NCoC's goal. At the core of NCoC's joint efforts is the belief that every person has the ability to help his or her community and country thrive.

NCoC was chartered by Congress in 1953 to harness the patriotic energy and national civic involvement surrounding World War II. In 2009, Congress named NCoC in the Edward M. Kennedy Serve America Act, expanding their Civic Health Initiative to become the nation's largest measure of civic engagement.

For the past 10 years NCoC, together with the Corporation for National and Community Service (CNCS) and state and community level collaborative networks across the nation, has documented the state of civic life in America in city, state, and national Civic Health Index (CHI) reports. NCoC plans to establish CHI partnerships in all 50 states and the District of Columbia by 2020.

The Civic Health Initiative has been an incubator for programs such as the Civic Data Challenge and The Civic 50. The Civic Data Challenge was a national competition to turn the raw data of civic health into useful applications and visualizations. The Civic 50 is an initiative to identify the 50 most community-minded companies in the nation.

The Annual Conference on Citizenship is NCoC's signature event. Held in proximity to Citizenship Day (also known as Constitution Day) in the fall, NCoC convenes leaders in the field of civic engagement to exchange information and to discuss ways to progress their shared mission of encouraging Americans to become fully involved citizens. In addition to the Annual Conference, NCoC has partnered with institutions to host and convene programs, events, webinars, and discussions throughout the year. NCoC works with non-partisan VoteRiders to spread state-specific information on voter ID requirements.

After 2013, NCoC expanded their programs to promote national service. They took a leading role in the creation of the Service Year technology platform. They worked in partnership with the Franklin Project at the Aspen Institute. The platform is an online marketplace designed to increase service opportunities for Americans between 18–28 years old. It brings together young people seeking service positions, organizations seeking service members, and funders looking to support these efforts.

== Mission statement ==
NCoC is a congressionally chartered organization dedicated to strengthening civic life in America. We believe every person has the power to help their community and country thrive.

== History ==
=== Origin: (1946–1953) ===
Purpose of NCoC: To Support and Strengthen the Efforts of the People in Maintaining the Blessings of Freedom and Justice and in Protecting and Perpetuating the Principles and Ideals upon which this Nation is Founded; to Develop a More Thorough Knowledge of Citizenship Rights and Responsibilities; to Inspire a Deeper Devotion to Citizenship Obligations; to Encourage Ever More Effective Participation in Citizenship Activities and to Promote a Spirit of Cooperation on the Part of all Citizens – to these High Purposes, the National Conference on Citizenship is Dedicated.

Founded in 1946, in the aftermath of the Second World War, NCoC was inspired by efforts of a diverse group of Americans and created with the goal of capturing and perpetuating, in peacetime, the spirit of cooperation and civic energy fostered during wartime. With the collective attention of the nation returning to domestic affairs, NCoC was imagined as a vehicle to highlight the critical importance of civic responsibility to the health of our republic so that all citizens might dedicate themselves to upholding continuously our concept of government and the democratic way of life.

The First National Conference on Citizenship was held on May 17–18, 1946 in Philadelphia, PA

=== Congressional Charter ===
On August 13, 1953, President Dwight Eisenhower signed a bill that was passed by both houses of Congress that incorporated the Conference; allowing the NCoC to now operate under a Federal Charter. A Federal Charter is federal statue that establishes a co-operation between the government and organizations, agencies, or institutions. In 1953, the goal of the Congressional Charter was to empower "the NCoC to translate its ideals and objectives into realities. Plans for the future include both long-range and immediate projects and activates. The Conference will initiate and conduct some of these activities directly. Other, it will encourage and assist organizations and agencies in States and communities to initiate and carry on. "There are approximately 1,478,000 non-profits in America—94 of them are chartered by Congress.

=== Present: (2004–present) ===
In 2006, NCoC convened a working group to create the first "America's Civic Health Index. "Utilizing a variety of indicators, the Civic Health Index (CHI) provides insight into civic trends at the national, state, city, and demographic level.

In 2009, Congress named NCoC in the Edward M. Kennedy Serve America Act. This legislation codified and expanded NCoC's CHI helping it become the nation's largest and most definitive measure of civic engagement.

In 2012, NCoC launched two new programs:

- The Civic 50 is an initiative to identify the 50 most community-minded companies in the nation. The Civic 50 surveys and ranks S&P 500 corporations on how they engage with the communities they serve and institutionalize these practices in their corporate culture. 2013 Rankings
- Civic Data Challenge is a nationwide online competition that brings together tech, design, and nonprofit professionals together with local community leaders and organization to create apps, websites, and other tools to be used to increase civic participation. View the 2013 winners.

In 2013, NCoC started its partnership with the Franklin Project at the Aspen Institute to develop a Service Year technology platform. This system aims to be a 21st-century tool that will increase the number of organizations that can provide national service opportunities and make it easier for young Americans to identify those positions.

== Structure ==
=== Board of directors ===
The National Conference on Citizenship's current Board of Directors consists of Katie Harbath (Chair), Barry Byrd, Joy Bonaguro, Adam Conner, Joy Fulkerson, James Johnson-Piett, Letty Hardi, Gail Leftwich Kitch, Allen Square, Michael Wieser, and Valerie Lemmie.

== Programs ==
NCoC's current programming includes the Civic Health Initiative, consisting of the Civic Health Index, and the Annual Conference on Citizenship.

=== Civic Health Index ===
The Civic Health Index (CHI) is at the center of NCoC's work. At NCoC, "civic health" is considered the way that communities are organized to define and address public problems. Communities with strong indicators of civic health have higher employment rates, stronger schools, better physical health, and more responsive governments. For the past 10 years NCoC, together with the Corporation for National and Community Service (CNCS) and state and community level collaborative networks across the nation, has documented the state of civic life in America in city, state, and national CHI reports. CHIs use a range of indicators including volunteering, voting, connections to civic and religious organizations, trust in other Americans and key institutions, and other civic behavior and attitudes.

CHI partnerships have changed the way governments go about their work, reintroduced civics to classrooms, redirected investments, influenced national and local conversations resulting in enhancing civic life, and bolstered a network of civic leaders across the country. By 2020, NCoC's goal is to integrate this pioneering initiative into ongoing partnerships in all 50 states and the District of Columbia.

America's Civic Health Index received a new level of recognition through its inclusion in the Edward M. Kennedy Serve America Act, which was signed into law in May 2009. The Act formalized a partnership between NCoC, the U.S. Census Bureau, and the Corporation for National and Community Service to develop, refine, and implement an annual civic health assessment.

In addition to the America's Civic Health Index report, the National Conference on Citizenship partners with local institutions to release state and city specific reports. NCoC currently works with over 30 local partners.

=== Annual conference ===
The National Conference on Citizenship hosts an annual conference on or around Citizenship Day. NCoC convenes leaders in the field of civic engagement along with other individuals and organizations interested in utilizing civic engagement principles and practices to enhance their work. Connecting people for the purpose of strengthening civic life is the goal. Each year's conference revolves around a different theme that concerns various aspects of civic engagement on a multitude of levels, including corporate, institutional, and individual responsibility.

Featured Annual Conference Speakers have included: Justice Antonin Scalia, former Justice Sandra Day O'Connor, Justice Anthony Kennedy, Senator Robert Byrd, Senator Harris Wofford, Senator Bob Graham, Jean Case, Sonal Shah, Minnesota Secretary of State Mark Ritchie, Scott Heiferman, Craig Newmark, & Sean Parker.

==== Past conferences ====
- 1953 – 8th Annual Conference – What Price, Freedom?
- 1954 – 9th Annual Conference – The Three Branches of our Federal Government, Yesterday, Today, & Tomorrow.
- 1956 – 11th Annual Conference – The Voting Citizen
- 1957 – 12th Annual Conference – Imperatives for Peace
- 1958 – 13th Annual Conference – Citizenship in a Changing World
- 1959 – 14th Annual Conference – US Citizenship: Know It, Cherish It, Live It
- 1960 – 15th Annual Conference – America: A Government of the People, for the People, by the People.
- 1961 – 16th Annual Conference – What We as Citizens Can Do for Our Country
- 1962 – 17th Annual Conference – What Can I Do for My Country in a Changing World?
- 1963 – 18th Annual Conference – American Citizenship: Showcase for Freedom
- 1966 – 19th Annual Conference – Supports of Freedom: The Law & The Ballot
- 1968– 23rd Annual Conference – Creative Citizenship and Its Applications
- 1969– 24th Annual Conference – Youth Engagement
- 2004 – 59th Annual Conference

What does it Mean to be a Citizen in America- A lecture by David McCullough on American national identity, the rights and responsibilities of citizenship, and the importance of an active, engaged citizenry.
Fostering Citizenship through Education- A panel discussion with Amy Kass, Alfonso Aguilar, Cynthia Gibson, and Charles Quigley.
Technology Strengthening Citizenship- A panel discussion with Gail Leftwich, Scott Heiferman, and Joe Trippi.

- 2005 – 60th Annual Conference

Citizenship and the Six Spheres of Influence: An Agenda for Social Capitalists- A lecture by Robert Putnam on social capital, its importance to functioning democracy, and how to build it.
Benjamin Franklin: "A Republic, If you Can Keep It"- A lecture by Walter Isaacson on Franklin's notion of active citizenship.
A Dialogue on Freedom- A lecture by Justice Anthony Kennedy on institutionalizing freedom and the role of civic education.
Workplaces: Corporate Citizenship- A panel discussion with Jean Case, John Bridgeland, Bill McDermott, and Michelle Nunn

- 2007 – 62nd Annual Conference

What Motivates Voting- A panel discussion with Amy Walter, Mark Ritchie, Ian Rowe, and Terence Smith.
Remarks from Justice Stephen Breyer
Beyond Glory- A play, written and performed by Stephen Lang, portraying Medal of Honor winners' reflections on their service.
Transformational Moments- A discussion with Brittany and Robbie Bergquist, Kari Dunn, Chris Myers Asch, and David B. Smith on entering and fostering active citizenship.

- 2008 – 63rd Annual Conference – Beyond the Vote
- 2009 – 64th Annual Conference – Sustainable Impact: A Civic Return on Investment
- 2010 – 65th Annual Conference – BIG Citizenship: Citizens as Catalysts and Innovators
- 2011 – 66th Annual Conference – Redefining America's Social Impact *First year the Conference was held outside of Washington, D.C.
- 2012 – 67th Annual Conference – Jobs, Jobs, Jobs: Exploring the link between civic engagement and employment
- 2013 – 68th Annual Conference – America's Charter: Past, Present, and Future
- 2016 – Civic Life, Civic Health and Civic Renewal: Through the Lens of Equity, Diversity and Inclusion *Co-hosted by Tufts University's Tisch College of Civic Life
- 2017 – Strengthening Civic Life in America

Exploring Civic Learning as a Pathway to Equity and Opportunity – A discussion led by NCoC and Philanthropy for Active Civic Engagement (PACE)
Dreamland: The True Tale of America's Opiate Epidemic – Keynote address by Sam Quinones, followed by a panel response
Closing the Opportunity Gap – Keynote address by Robert Putnam, followed by a panel response

=== Awards ===
==== Joseph H. Kanter Citizen of the Year Award ====
Named for NCoC's long-time chairman, the Citizen of the Year Award is granted to a private citizen who has exemplified active citizenship in contributing to the public good.

Past winners have included: Mack McCarter, Founder of Community Renewal International (2018), Robert Putnam, Professor of Public Policy at Harvard University (2017), Arthur Dean, Chairman and CEO of Community Anti Drug Coalitions of America (2016), David Rubenstein, Co-Founder and Co-CEO of The Carlyle Group (2013), Jack Miller, philanthropist, businessman, and chairman of the Jack Miller Center for Teaching America's Founding Principles and History (2012), Jean Case and Steve Case (2011), TIME Managing Editor Rick Stengel (2010), Philanthropists Eugene Lang (2008) & Ray Chambers (2007), Educational Pioneer Irasema Salcido (2006), Congressman Lee H. Hamilton (2005), and Senator Harris Wofford (2004).

==== Franklin Award ====
The Franklin Award is given to outstanding individuals in federal service who are working to strength citizenship in America. The award bears the famous Franklin quote, "A Republic if you can keep it", his response when asked what style of government the Constitution would create.

Past winners have included General Ann Dunwoody (2013), Honorable Norman Y. Mineta (2012), Congresswoman Gabrielle Giffords (2011), Justice Ruth Bader Ginsburg (2010), Justice Antonin Scalia (2009), former Justice Sandra Day O'Connor (2008), Justice Stephen Breyer (2007), Senator Robert C. Byrd of West Virginia (2006), and Senator Lamar Alexander (2005)

==== Major George A. Smith Memorial Fund "HOOAH" Award ====
This award recognizes a notable veteran who defines their citizenship and service to our country, both in uniform and beyond.

Past winners are Brenda Sue Fulton (2018), Honorable Tulsi Gabbard (2013), Chris Marvin (2012), Eric Hilleman (2011), Derek Blumke (Student Veterans of America) (2010).

==== Role Model of the Year Award ====
The Role Model of the Year Award is designed to recognize individuals who use their public presence to inspire others and give back to their community. Past winners include Alfred Morris, Running Back for the Washington Redskins (2013), and Nnamdi Asomugha, Defensive Back for the Philadelphia Eagles (2012).

==== Other awards ====
Jane Addams Award, Scott Heiferman (2005); Young Citizen of the Year Award, Robbie Bergquist and Brittany Bergquist (2007).

=== Service Year Exchange ===
NCoC partnered with the Franklin Project at The Aspen Institute to develop a national service technology platform called the Service Year Exchange. The system is a 21st-century tool to increase the number of organizations that can provide national service opportunities and make it easier for young Americans to identify those positions. In January 2016, the Service Year Exchange project merged with ServiceNation and the Franklin Project at the Aspen Institute to form Service Year Alliance.

== Notable past directors ==
- Tom Clark (Appointed in 1950) 59th Attorney General of the United States under President Harry Truman from 1945 to 1949 and an Associate Justice of the United States Supreme Court from 1949–1967.
- Earle Hawkins (Appointed in 1953) First Vice President of the Board of Directors of NCoC in 1960.
- Willard E. Givens (Appointed in 1960) Past Executive Secretary of the National Education Association from 1935 to 1952.
- Thomas J. Lane Past United States Representative of Massachusetts.
- Alvin M. Bentley (Appointed in 1960) Past Representative of Michigan's 8th District
- Brooks Hays (Appointed in 1960) Past Representative of Arkansas' 5th District and adviser to President John F. Kennedy.
- Lawrence Augusta Oxley (Appointed in 1960) Past Community Organizer-Influential Social Change Advocate of his time.
- J. Albert Woll (Appointed in 1958) Past General Counsel for the American Federation of Labor and Congress of Industrial Organizations, Special Assistant to the Attorney General of the United States, and former United States Attorney for Northern District of Illinois.

== Notable past chairmen ==
- Presidents Harry S. Truman and Dwight D. Eisenhower (who signed NCoC's Congressional Charter) served as honorary members.
- Earl Warren Chief Justice of the United States in 1953.
- Warren E. Burger Chief Justice of the United States in 1969.
- Harlan Fiske Stone 52nd United States Attorney General in 1924 and Chief Justice of the United States in 1941.
- Charles Evans Hughes 36th Governor of New York, the 44th United States Secretary of State, and the 11th Chief Justice of the United States Supreme Court.
- Alben Barkley Past Vice President of the United States under President Truman.
