= John Bridgeland =

American politician (b. 1960)

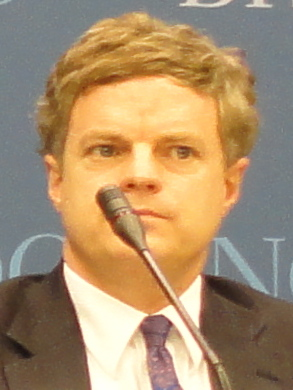
- Bridgeland in January 2012

Director of the Domestic Policy Council
- In office January 20, 2001 – January 30, 2002
- President: George W. Bush
- Preceded by: Bruce Reed
- Succeeded by: Margaret Spellings

Personal details
- Born: May 1, 1960 (age 65)
- Party: Republican
- Spouse: Maureen Fallon
- Education: Harvard University (BA); University of Virginia (JD)

John M. Bridgeland (born May 1, 1960) is a former director of the United States Domestic Policy Council and USA Freedom Corps. He is president and CEO of the public policy firm Civic Enterprises, the co-founder and CEO of the COVID Collaborative and the vice-chair of the non-profit organization Malaria No More.

Bridgeland served as Director of the White House Domestic Policy Council, Assistant to the President of the United States, and first director of the USA Freedom Corps after 9/11 under President George W. Bush, and a Member of the White House Council for Community Solutions under President Barack Obama.

== Education and career ==
Bridgeland is a graduate of Harvard University and the University of Virginia School of Law. Prior to working in the White House and the United States Congress, Bridgeland practiced law in the New York City and Paris offices of Davis Polk & Wardwell. He also worked as chief of staff and special counsel to then-U.S. Congressman (now U.S. Senator) Rob Portman.

Bridgeland worked in the White House from 2001 to 2003, first as deputy assistant to the president under George W. Bush and director of the White House Domestic Policy Council, then as assistant to the president and director of the USA Freedom Corps. In his work overseeing more than $1 billion in domestic and international service programs in the aftermath of September 11, 2001, former senator Harris Wofford described him as "one of the most impressive people I've seen in public life in recent times".

In 2004, he served as a teaching fellow at Harvard Kennedy School, where he offered a seminar on presidential decision making. From 2012 to 2015, he served as the co-chair of the Leadership Council of the Franklin Project, a policy program of the Aspen Institute that sought to make a year of service a common opportunity and expectation for young Americans.

In 2020, Bridgeland co-founded The Covid Collaborative, a bi-partisan organization which assembled a diverse and comprehensive team of leading experts in health, education, and the economy to shape the work of the American response to the COVID pandemic by developing consensus recommendations and engaging with state and local leaders across America on their implementation – "ensuring that our efforts are truly from the nation, for the nation".

Bridgeland is also the long-serving president and CEO of Civic Enterprises, a public policy firm in Washington, D.C., and vice-chair of Malaria No More, a non-profit launched at the White House Summit on Malaria which aims to end malaria in sub-Saharan Africa. He has also conducted research on America's "Silent Epidemic" of high school drop-out. His report prompted the TIME cover story Dropout Nation, and two Oprah Winfrey shows on the topic. Bridgeland also led the National Summit on America's Silent Epidemic with the Bill & Melinda Gates Foundation, the National Governors Association, TIME Magazine and MTV.

He currently serves as a board member on the Public Advisory Board at the New Hampshire Institute of Politics at Saint Anselm College.

== Published works ==
He is the author of Heart of the Nation: Volunteering and America's Civic Spirit (Rowman & Littlefield, 2012).

== Personal life ==
He lives with his wife, Maureen, in McLean, Virginia. They have three children. An accomplished tennis player in his youth, he enjoyed a successful amateur career and played on the varsity tennis team at Harvard College.

== Notes and references ==
Political offices
Preceded by Bruce Reed	Director of the Domestic Policy Council; 2001–2002	Succeeded by Margaret Spellings
