= Franklin Project =

- Successor: Service Year Alliance
- Formation: October 2012
- Dissolved: December 2015
- Purpose: Advancing national service in the United States
- Location: Washington, DC
- Director: Jay Mangone
- Parent organization: Policy Program of the Aspen Institute

The Franklin Project was a policy program of the Aspen Institute from October 2012 to December 2015, that focused on advancing national service in the United States. Walter Isaacson called the project the "biggest idea" to come out of the Aspen Ideas Festival during his tenure as CEO of the Aspen Institute. In January 2016, the project merged with ServiceNation and the Service Year Exchange project of the National Conference on Citizenship to form Service Year Alliance (a new 501(c)(3) non-profit operating as a joint venture of the Aspen Institute and Be the Change, Inc.).

== History ==
In 2012, Stanley McChrystal was interviewed by Bob Schieffer at the Aspen Ideas Festival. As part of that interview, McChrystal was asked whether or not he believed in the draft. He responded that he thought every young person should serve, but the military does not need every young person, so we need to create more opportunities for all young Americans to serve.

McChrystal's remarks generated a lot of enthusiasm within the Aspen Institute community and several leaders within the United States national service community, along with Aspen Institute CEO Walter Isaacson, approached him to see if he would be interested in helping to form a new initiative around the concept that every young person should do a year or more of national service. He agreed and the Franklin Project was created in October 2012 as a policy program of the Aspen Institute.

The project built a five-person team and a variety of councils of prominent Americans to advance the concept that a year or more of national service should become a common opportunity and expectation for young Americans. The project primarily relied on summits, convenings, initiatives, and writing by thought leaders associated with the project.

Over time, the project began to explore how it might work more closely together with its partners ServiceNation, the Service Year Exchange project of the National Conference on Citizenship, and Voices for National Service. With support from the Einhorn Family Charitable Trust, the four organizations worked together to develop a joint operating plan to ensure their collective efforts were adding up to impact greater than the sum of their individual efforts. At the end of a year-long planning process, three of the organizations (the Franklin Project, Service Nation, the Service Year Exchange project of the National Conference on Citizenship) decided the best way to achieve the new plan was to merge. The new 501(c)(3) non-profit organization is called Service Year Alliance, and operates as a joint venture between the Aspen Institute and Be the Change, Inc. Voices for National Service decided to remain independent, but is a close partner of the new organization.

== Summits ==
=== 21st Century National Service Summit ===
On June 24 and 25, 2013, the project hosted the 21st Century National Service Summit in Aspen, Colorado, as a lead-in event to the Aspen Ideas Festival. The summit sought to "present bold new ideas to make national service a common expectation and opportunity for all young Americans" and inspire participants to "make specific commitments to fulfill the vision of the Franklin Project." Over 275 leaders from business, labor, higher education, government, military, faith-based community, philanthropy, and nonprofit organizations attended. At the summit the project also released its 21st Century National Service Action Plan.

Speakers at the summit included: General Stanley McChrystal, former commander, International Security Assistance Force and US Forces Afghanistan and chair of the Franklin Project's Leadership Council; CNN senior political analyst and director of Harvard Kennedy School Center for Public Leadership David Gergen; Vice President Biden's chief of staff Bruce Reed; former Deputy Undersecretary of Defense Rob Gordon, Clinton Foundation board member Chelsea Clinton; former US Senator Mel Martinez; Corporation for National and Community Service CEO Wendy Spencer; journalist, author & former California first lady Maria Shriver; Civic Enterprises CEO and Franklin Project co-chair John Bridgeland; City Year co-founder and Franklin Project co-chair Alan Khazei; ABC News contributor Matthew Dowd; former Undersecretary of Defense Michèle Flournoy; Teach For America founder and chair Wendy Kopp; former governor of Idaho, US senator & US Interior secretary Dirk Kempthorne; Global Health Corps CEO and co-founder Barbara Bush; Target Community Relations president Laysha Ward; Huffington Post president, chair and editor-in-chief Arianna Huffington; former Bush White House director of the White House Office of Faith-Based and Community Initiatives John DiIulio; PBS president Paula Kerger; White House Office of Social Innovation and Civic Participation director Jonathan Greenblatt; Peace Corps deputy director Carrie Hessler-Radelet; former assistant to President George W. Bush, Michael Gerson; New Orleans, Louisiana, mayor Mitch Landrieu; Providence, Rhode Island, mayor Angel Taveras; Nashville, Tennessee, mayor Karl Dean; Bank of America Foundation president Kerry Sullivan; and Aspen Institute president and CEO Walter Isaacson.

The summit was sponsored by JPMorgan Chase, Target, Accenture, Bank of America, Burson Marsteller, Time magazine, Laura & Gary Lauder, Jonathan & Jeannie Lavine, the Laurie M. Tisch Illumination Fund, the Hauptman Family Foundation, Case Foundation, Entertainment Industry Foundation, Bright House Networks, State Farm, Voices For National Service, and the MCJ Amelior Foundation.

=== Summit at Gettysburg: Our Unfinished Work ===
From June 4 to 6, 2014, the project hosted the Summit at Gettysburg: Our Unfinished Work in Gettysburg, Pennsylvania, in partnership with the National Conference on Citizenship, ServiceNation, and Voices for National Service. The summit sought to "awaken a new citizenship in the country, grounded in a service year as a rite of passage for all 18 to 28 year olds." Over 350 participants from the private sector, higher education, government, the military, faith communities, philanthropy, and nonprofit organizations attended.

Speakers at the summit included: Franklin Project Leadership Council chair General (Ret.) Stanley McChrystal; vice-chair of the Clinton Foundation Chelsea Clinton; CEO & co-founder of Global Health Corps Barbara Bush; CNN senior political analyst David Gergen; co-host of CNN's Crossfire S.E. Cupp; Washington Post columnist E.J. Dionne; author and former senior editor of Newsweek Jonathan Alter, CNN political contributor Paul Begala; Washington Post columnist Michael Gerson; US Army captain (ret.) and author Wes Moore; senior vice president of Corporate Affairs at Cisco Tae Yoo; chairman & CEO of Special Olympics Tim Shriver; chief marketing officer at eBay Richelle Parham; chief diversity officer and senior vice president at Time Warner, Lisa Garcia Quiroz; vice president at Google[x] Megan Smith; head of Social Impact at LinkedIn Meg Garlinghouse; president of Be the Change Rob Gordon; US president United Way Worldwide Stacey Stewart; CEO of Catholic Charities Rev. Larry Snyder; former US Secretary of Transportation Ray LaHood; CEO of the Corporation for National and Community Service Wendy Spencer; former director of the White House Domestic Policy Council and chair Forum for Community Solutions Melody Barnes; former member of the US House of Representatives Harold Ford, Jr.; mayor of Flint, Michigan, Dayne Walling; former US secretary of education Margaret Spellings; former vice chief of staff of the Army General (Ret.) Peter W. Chiarelli; former chairman of the FCC Michael Powell; and president and CEO of the Aspen Institute Walter Isaacson.

The summit was sponsored by Mike and Jackie Bezos, the Resnick Family Foundation, JPMorgan Chase & Co., the MacArthur Foundation, Laura & Gary Lauder, the Tisch Illumination Fund, Julie Fisher Cummings, and Mike Gridley.

The program collaborated with the journal Democracy to release an issue coinciding with the summit that featured a symposium on national service.

== Initiatives ==
=== Huffington Post series ===
From June 2013 to November 2016, the project collaborated with the Huffington Post to tell stories of support for national service from a variety of perspectives, resulting in twenty-seven stories. The majority of these posts were a series of twenty-posts written by members of the Ambassadors Program in November 2016.

=== Enlisting America Pledge ===
In June 2014, the project released "Enlisting America: A Call to National Service From Those Who Have Served". Top leaders and organizations representing the United States military endorsed two ideas by signing their name to the pledge:

1. There should be an opportunity - and expectation - that every young American serves their country for a year.
2. There are many ways to serve your country; military and civilian national service are two sides of the same coin.

=== Employers of National Service ===
On September 12, 2014, President Barack Obama launched the Employers of National Service initiative at the 20th anniversary of AmeriCorps event on the South Lawn of the White House. Employers participating in the initiative connect to the talent pipeline of AmeriCorps, Peace Corps, and other service year alumni, by indicating in their hiring processes that they view national service experience as a plus. The initiative is a collaboration between the program with the Corporation for National and Community Service, the Peace Corps, AmeriCorps Alums, and the National Peace Corps Association. To date, over 500 employers have joined the initiative.

=== Service Year + Higher Education Innovation Challenge ===
In spring 2015, in partnership with the Lumina Foundation, the National Conference on Citizenship, and the Corporation for National and Community Service, the project ran a Service Year + Higher Education Innovation Challenge that "challenged higher education institutions to create innovative new service year opportunities connected to academic credit for their students." Over 200 universities engaged in the challenge and 32 ultimately submitted detailed proposals for consideration.

The top three proposals from each category (community college, public, and private categories) were invited to the Aspen Institute in Washington, DC, to compete for $100,000 in prizes at an in-person pitch day on April 15, 2015.

Finalists and winners of the challenge were:

- Community College: Alamo Colleges; Miami Dade College (winner); and Salt Lake Community College
- Public University: San Jose State; University of Kentucky; University of Massachusetts Dartmouth (winner)
- Private University: Drake University (winner); Mount St. Joseph University; Saint Peter's University

The challenge was run again in 2016 by the project's successor organization, Service Year Alliance.

=== Ambassadors Program ===
In May 2015, the project launched their Ambassadors Program, a twelve-month "leadership development program and local engagement strategy" with the aim of increasing support for national service in communities across the country. The program had three priorities:

1. Make national service part of the 2016 election conversation.
2. Increase the number of service year positions available in communities across the United States.
3. Steward the next generation of national service leaders.

Forty-five ambassadors from twenty-five states were selected and began their term with a three-day training Alexandria, Virginia.

== Programs inspired ==
A variety of programs and initiatives were created by participants inspired by the project's programming.

=== ArtistYear ===
Margo Drakos and Elizabeth Warshawer founded ArtistYear after attending the 21st Century National Service Summit and were inspired to create the first national service program specifically for artists. ArtistYear brings the power of the arts to underserved schools with limited arts instruction and access by providing exceptional artists with a dedicated service year that goes beyond traditional community service outreach. Today, ArtistYear has corps members in three cities: Philadelphia, New York City, and Roaring Fork Valley, Colorado.

=== NYC Service ===
In July 2014, the project collaborated with NYC Service and United Way of New York City to help them launch their effort to double the number of service year opportunities in New York City. The effort was launched at a summit on the effort at the Roosevelt House, attended by over 100 heads of major institutions, academic centers, nonprofits and corporations. Speakers at the summit included: Bill de Blasio, mayor of New York City; Paula Gavin, chief service officer of New York City; Sheena Wright, CEO of United Way of New York City; Jennifer Raab, president of Hunter College; Joel Berg, executive director of the New York City Coalition Against Hunger; Felix V. Matos Rodriguez, president of Queens College; Tim McClimon, president of the American Express Foundation; and Laurie Tisch, president of the Laurie M. Tisch Illumination Fund.

=== Tufts 1+4 ===
In collaboration with the project, Tufts University launched Tufts 1+4, in February 2014. The 1+4 program provides applicants to Tufts the opportunity to check off on their application that they would be interested in doing a year of service to begin their college experience. If admitted, Tufts places those interested students in selected service organizations to engage in a year of full-time national or international service before beginning the traditional college experience (hence 1 year of service + 4 years of traditional college experience).

=== Baltimore Corps ===
Fagan Harris was an early advisor to the project and went on to created Baltimore Corps, a service year program that seeks to "enlist talent to accelerate social innovation in Baltimore and advance a citywide agenda for equity and racial justice." The Aspen Institute served as Baltimore Corps' fiscal sponsor as it got off the ground.

== Leadership ==
=== Director ===
The project was led by Marine Corps veteran Jason Mangone. Mangone shepherded the project's merger into its successor organization, Service Year Alliance, where he served as its founding chief operating officer.

=== Leadership Council ===
The project was advised by a Leadership Council of prominent Americans. Retired US Army General Stanley McChrystal served as chair and former White House Domestic Policy Council Director John Bridgeland and City Year Co-Founder Alan Khazei served as vice-chairs. Examples of other notable members included Madeleine Albright, Barbara Bush, and Chelsea Clinton.

=== Young Leaders Council ===
The program ran a Young Leaders Council consisting of a bipartisan group of emerging millennial leaders from a variety of sectors. The council hoped to develop and steward future leaders who view universal national service as their generation's legacy and would be willing to work together across party lines to eventually foster bipartisan legislation in support of it. Examples of council members included: Steven Olikara, founder and president of the Millennial Action Project; Joshua Marcuse, chairman of the Young Professionals in Foreign Policy; John McCarthy, executive director of Future Civic Leaders; and Anastasia Dellaccio, senior officer at the UN Foundation. Featured speakers at council meetings included: Olivier Knox of Yahoo News, Representative Joe Kennedy, and Representative Seth Moulton.

== Publications ==
=== 21st Century National Service Action Plan ===
At the 21st Century National Service Summit in June 2013, the project released its "21st Century National Service Action Plan", a 39-page plan that outlines how the United States could create a system of that engages at least one million young adults annually in a year of full-time national service as "civic rite of passage". The plan includes signatures by fifty-eight prominent Americans as endorsers.

=== Voters for National Service ===
The projected collaborated with Voices for National Service, Civic Enterprises, and Hart Research Associates to research voter perspectives on national service (1,000 voter sample size). In June 2013 they released the results in "Voters for National Service: Perspectives of American Voters on Large-Scale National Service". The key findings of the study were:

1. American voters have a positive view of national service and a broad understanding of what the term national service means.
2. When asked what goals they have for our country, voters see many pressing needs and think the country could do more.
3. Voters overwhelmingly favor a system of voluntary national service, but oppose mandatory service.
4. Voters say the country and national service participants would benefit greatly—and in a variety of ways—from a national service program.
5. Despite voters' concerns with government spending, more than three in four say that increased funding for national service would be worth it.
6. Voters express real interest in participating in a national service program.
7. Voters favor a range of policy ideas to expand national service opportunities to more Americans, including many ideas currently being explored by the national service field.

=== "The Economic Value of National Service" report ===
The project collaborated with Voices for National Service, Civic Enterprises, and the Center for Benefit-Cost Studies in Education at Columbia University to study the economic value of national service and published a report in September 2013. The primary finding was that "the benefit-cost ratio is 3.9: for every dollar invested in the network of national service programs currently operating, there is a social return of almost four dollars." Clive Belfield of Columbia University was the author of the study.
