= Willard Earl Givens =

American educator (1886–1971)

Willard Earl Givens (1886–1971) was an American educator, notable as the executive secretary of the National Education Association from 1935 to 1952. Before this he was president of the California Education Association. He described himself as a Socialist, but opposed Communism, generally supporting President Franklin Roosevelt. As head of the NEA he helped teachers organize for higher salaries.

Willard E. Givens served on the National Conference On Citizenship Board of Directors in 1960.

== Bibliography ==
- "Education for the New America," a report given at the 72nd Annual Meeting of the NEA, Washington D.C., July 1934.
- "Progress and problems of our association," Proceedings of the Seventy-Fifth Annual Meeting Held in Detroit, Michigan June 27 to July 1, 1937, Volume 75, 1937.
- "The Association Of Nations", 1955.
- "Communism Menaces Freedom" (with Belmont M. Farley), anti-communist pamphlet, 1962
- The Reminiscences of Dr. Willard E. Givens, typescript, Oral History Research Office, Columbia University, 1980. (Sixty-six page transcription of a tape-recorded interview conducted by Paul Hopper with Givens in Washington, D.C., in 1968.)
