= Elliot Gerson =

American executive, lawyer and government official

- Born: July 15, 1952 (age 73); New Haven, Connecticut, U.S.
- Education: Harvard University; Magdalen College, Oxford; Yale Law School
- Occupations: Executive Vice President, The Aspen Institute
- Years active: 2004–present
- Title: American Secretary to the Rhodes Trust

Elliot Francis Gerson (born July 15, 1952) is an American nonprofit executive, lawyer, business executive, state and federal government official, American Secretary of The Rhodes Trust, currently serving as the executive vice president of The Aspen Institute.

== Early life and education ==
Elliot Francis Gerson was born in New Haven, Connecticut, on July 15, 1952. He was an undergraduate at Harvard University, a Rhodes Scholar at Magdalen College in Oxford, and a law student at Yale Law School. He was a US Supreme Court clerk, practiced law in government and privately, held executive positions in state and federal government and on a presidential campaign, and was president of start-ups in health care and education, and of two insurance and healthcare companies.

== Career ==
Gerson is the executive vice president of the Aspen Institute, a nonpartisan organization based in Washington, D.C. He is responsible for its Policy Programs and International Partners. He was also the American Secretary to the Rhodes Trust for 25 years, responsible for the Rhodes Scholarships in the United States, and continues to serve on its Board.

=== Law ===
Gerson’s career has included work as a civilian assistant to U.S. Secretary of Defense Harold Brown in the Carter administration, during which time he was awarded the Defense Meritorious Civilian Service Medal. He was Special Assistant to the Secretary of Health, Education and Welfare (now the Department of Health and Human Services), Joseph Califano, in the Carter administration. He was a clerk to Judge Harold Leventhal of the United States Court of Appeals for the D.C. Circuit, and also clerk to Justice Potter Stewart of the Supreme Court of the United States.

=== Deputy Attorney General of Connecticut ===
He practiced law as the Deputy Attorney General of Connecticut where he argued cases including in the State and U.S. Supreme Courts, and briefly before that in private practice in Hartford, Connecticut and Washington, D.C.

== Financial services industry ==
Gerson then entered the financial services industry where he rose to Executive Vice President of The Travelers Corporation and President of its managed healthcare and health insurance business, and was briefly Executive Vice President for successor companies MetraHealth and United Health Care. He subsequently led smaller start-up companies in technology and specialized health care.

=== Policy director, finance chair, Joseph Lieberman campaign ===
Gerson worked as Policy Director then Finance Chair in the 2004 presidential campaign of Senator Joseph I. Lieberman.

=== Mandela Rhodes Foundation, the Äänit Prize ===
In 2003, Gerson and colleagues met with former South African President Nelson Mandela, regarding the establishment of a new foundation focused on expanding opportunities for Africans in higher education. This became the Mandela Rhodes Foundation which offers young leaders from across the African continent a chance to become part of Nelson Mandela’s legacy of transformative impact. In 2021 Gerson Chaired the Judges' Panel of the Foundation’s inaugural Äänit Prize, which supports initiatives that can deliver positive social impact for Africa’s most marginalized populations.

=== American Secretary, The Rhodes Trust ===
Gerson was the American Secretary to The Rhodes Trust for 25 years, administering the Rhodes Scholarships in the United States from 1998 to 2023. The earliest and arguably most famous of all international scholarships, the Rhodes Scholarships offer two to four years of funding to attend the University of Oxford in the United Kingdom, and the United States is by far the largest Rhodes constituency, with 32 Scholars elected annually. Gerson was appointed by Trust CEO and Warden Sir Anthony Kenny in 1998 as its fifth American Secretary, following David Alexander, and stepped down in 2023. In 2014, for his contribution to the University of Oxford, Gerson was recognized as a "Distinguished Friend of Oxford.” He still serves on the Scholarship Committee of the Rhodes Trustees. Prior to becoming American Secretary, Gerson was a Rhodes Scholar for over a decade, and Assistant Secretary to the Trust under then Secretary William J. Barber from 1977 to 1979.

== Arts, humanities and social services ==
Active over his career in a wide range of community activities, particularly in the arts, humanities and social services, Gerson served as president of the Hartford Stage Company, president of The Hartford Courant Foundation, and trustee of Connecticut Public Broadcasting Network. He also served as a director of the Connecticut Humanities Council, the Connecticut Historical Society, the Connecticut Women’s Education and Legal Foundation, and the Connecticut Civil Liberties Union.

Additionally, Gerson was a trustee of The Shakespeare Theatre in Washington, D.C., and was a member of its executive committee. He was a trustee of the Bazelon Center for Mental Health Law, and is a Council on Foreign Relations member. He was also the chair of the first selection committee of the George J. Mitchell Scholarships for U.S. college graduates to study at Irish universities, a program modeled on the Rhodes Scholarships.

== Board service ==
Gerson has served on many non-profit boards and advisory committees, especially in the arts. His current Board service includes The Aspen Institute International Partners in Germany, Japan, Ukraine, Mexico, New Zealand, and the United Kingdom. He also serves on the board of the Service Year Alliance, which is dedicated to expanding opportunities for civilian national service in the United States.

== Personal life ==
Gerson’s father was Louis L. Gerson, who was born in Tomaszow Lubelski, Poland in 1921. He earned his PhD at Yale and was a professor of Political Science at the University of Connecticut, and its department chair.

His mother, Elizabeth Shanley Gerson, was born in New York City in 1928 to Irish immigrants and was soon orphaned. She earned her B.A. and Master of Social Work at the University of Connecticut and practiced as a geriatric social worker. In 1997, the Gerson Family endowed the Elizabeth Shanley Gerson Irish Literature Reading at the University of Connecticut, to bring an Irish writer to the University every year.

Gerson’s siblings include William Gerson and Ann Swanson. He has five children and two stepchildren: Emily Rosenthal, Hilary Axtmayer, Alexander Gerson, Marissa Newton, Jillian McLeod, Diana Ryan and Julia Ryan. He is a resident of Snowmass Village, Colorado, as well as Washington, D. C., and La Paz, BCS, Mexico.

== See also ==
- List of law clerks for the eighth seat of the Supreme Court of the United States
