= Harris Wofford =

American politician (1926–2019)

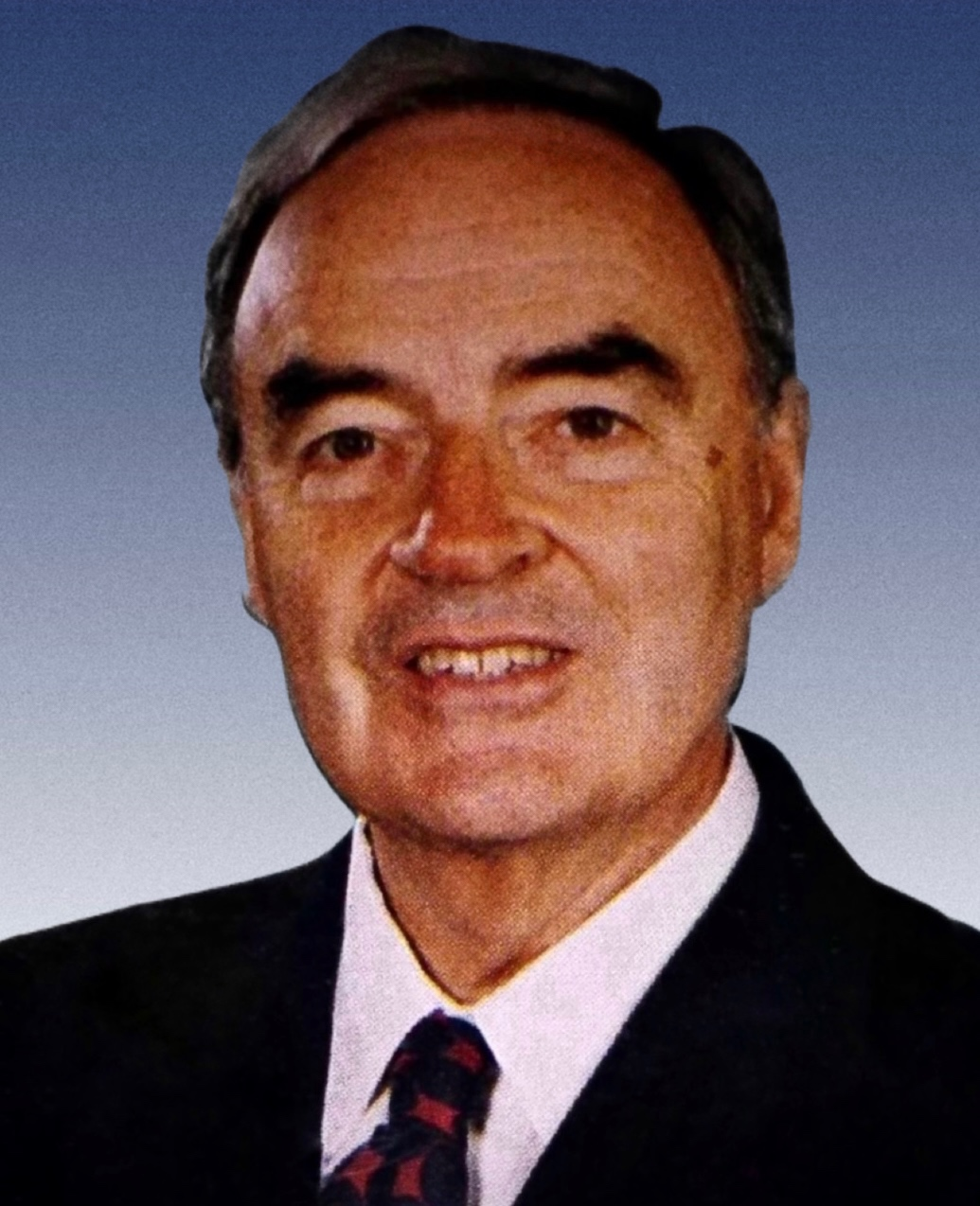
- Wofford during his tenure as U.S. Senator

CEO of the Corporation for National and Community Service
- In office 1995–2001
- President: Bill Clinton
- Preceded by: Eli Segal
- Succeeded by: Leslie Lenkowsky

United States Senator from Pennsylvania
- In office May 8, 1991 – January 3, 1995
- Preceded by: John Heinz
- Succeeded by: Rick Santorum

Pennsylvania Secretary of Labor and Industry
- In office March 23, 1987 – May 8, 1991
- Governor: Bob Casey Sr.
- Preceded by: James Knepper
- Succeeded by: Tom Foley

Chair of the Pennsylvania Democratic Party
- In office June 28, 1986 – December 6, 1986
- Preceded by: Edward Mezvinsky
- Succeeded by: Larry Yatch

5th President of Bryn Mawr College
- In office 1970–1978
- Preceded by: Katharine Elizabeth McBride
- Succeeded by: Mary Patterson McPherson

President of the State University of New York, Old Westbury
- In office 1966–1970
- Preceded by: Position established
- Succeeded by: John D. Maguire

Personal details
- Born: Harris Llewellyn Wofford Jr. April 9, 1926 New York City, U.S.
- Died: January 21, 2019 (aged 92) Washington, D.C., U.S.
- Party: Democratic
- Spouses: Clare Lindgren (m. 1948; died 1996); Matthew Charlton (m. 2016)
- Children: 3
- Education: University of Chicago (BA); Howard University (attended); Yale University (LLB)

Military service
- Allegiance: United States
- Branch/service: United States Army
- Unit: United States Army Air Forces
- Battles/wars: World War II

Harris Llewellyn Wofford Jr. (April 9, 1926 – January 21, 2019) was an American attorney, civil rights activist, and Democratic Party politician who represented Pennsylvania in the United States Senate from 1991 to 1995. A noted advocate of national service and volunteering, Wofford was also the fifth president of Bryn Mawr College from 1970 to 1978, was chairman of the Pennsylvania Democratic Party in 1986, was Pennsylvania Secretary of Labor and Industry in the cabinet of Governor Bob Casey Sr. from 1987 to 1991, and was a surrogate for Barack Obama's 2008 presidential campaign. He introduced Obama in Philadelphia at the National Constitution Center before Obama's speech on race in America, "A More Perfect Union."

== Early life ==
Wofford was born in 1926 in Manhattan, New York City, the son of Estelle Allison (née Gardner) and Harris Llewellyn Wofford. He was born to a wealthy and prominent Southern family.

At age 11 he accompanied his widowed grandmother on a six-month world tour. They spent Christmas Eve in Bethlehem, visited Shanghai shortly after the Imperial Japanese Army captured it, spent time in India where Wofford became "fascinated" by Mahatma Gandhi and visited Rome, where they saw Benito Mussolini announce Italy's withdrawal from the League of Nations and a subsequent fascist parade. While attending Scarsdale High School, he was inspired by Clarence Streit's plea for a world government to found the Student Federalists. By the time he was 18, the organization had grown so large that Newsweek predicted he would become president.

He served in the United States Army Air Forces during the Second World War and was a 1948 graduate of the University of Chicago. After eight months on a fellowship in India, conducting a study of the recently assassinated Gandhi, he and his wife Clare returned to America. He subsequently enrolled at historically black Howard Law School, the first white male student to do so. After one year, he concluded his studies at Yale Law School, where he received his law degree in June 1954. He began his public service career as a legal assistant for Rev. Theodore M. Hesburgh on the United States Commission on Civil Rights, serving from 1957 to 1959. In 1959, he became a law professor at University of Notre Dame. He was an early supporter of the Civil Rights Movement in the South in the 1950s, accompanying Indian activist Ram Manohar Lohia on a tour of the South in 1951 and becoming a friend and unofficial advisor to Martin Luther King Jr.

== Kennedy administration ==
Wofford first met John F. Kennedy in 1947 at a party at Clare Boothe Luce's Connecticut home. Wofford's political career began in 1960 when Kennedy asked him to join his presidential campaign and work with Sargent Shriver on winning over the "Negro vote".

When Martin Luther King was imprisoned shortly before the election, Wofford and Shriver persuaded Kennedy to call King's wife, Coretta Scott King, who faced the specter of her husband sentenced to hard labor in a Georgia prison for a minor traffic violation while she was in an advanced stage of pregnancy. This prompted Martin Luther King Sr. to switch his endorsement from Richard Nixon to Kennedy without the knowledge of Ted Sorensen, Ted Kennedy and Kenneth O'Donnell. Following the phone call, Wofford and other Kennedy aides assembled a pamphlet that referenced the call, printed on blue paper and known as the "blue bomb"; some 2 million copies were circulated, mostly through African American churches—"below the registry of the news and white culture. It had enormous influence among black voters."

In 1961, Kennedy appointed him as a Special Assistant to the President for Civil Rights. In the White House, he was chairman of the Subcabinet Group on Civil Rights. Wofford was instrumental in the formation of the Peace Corps and was the Peace Corps' special representative to Africa and director of operations in Ethiopia. He was appointed associate director of the Peace Corps in 1964 and held that position until 1966. He also participated in the Selma to Montgomery marches in 1965. Wofford's book Of Kennedys and Kings: Making Sense of the Sixties details his years in the civil rights movement and the creation of the Peace Corps.

== Academic career and private practice ==
In 1966, Wofford left politics to become president of the State University of New York at Old Westbury. At the 1968 Democratic Convention in Chicago, Wofford risked his career by allowing himself to be arrested in protest of police brutality. In 1970, he became president of Bryn Mawr College in Pennsylvania, holding that post until 1978.

In 1978, Wofford joined the law firm of Schnader Harrison Segal & Lewis LLP.

== Political career ==
=== In Pennsylvania ===
After spending seven years in private law practice in Philadelphia, Wofford was the Chairman of the Pennsylvania Democratic Party from June to December 1986. In March 1987, he was appointed by Pennsylvania Governor Bob Casey Sr. as the state's Secretary of Labor and Industry.

=== 1991 U.S. Senate special election victory ===
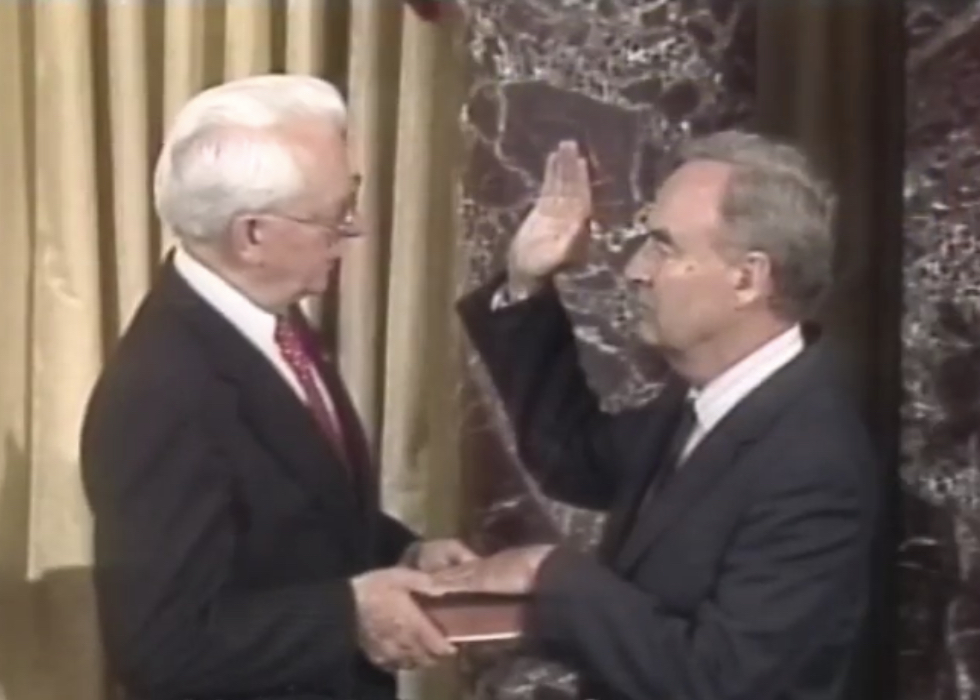
Wofford takes the U.S. Senate Oath of Office, administered by Senate President pro Tempore Robert Byrd

On April 4, 1991, Pennsylvania's senior U.S. Senator, H. John Heinz III, died when his small plane collided with a helicopter, leaving his seat in the U.S. Senate open. By law, the Pennsylvania governor was required to appoint a replacement until a special election could be held for the seat. After considering several potential candidates, including Chrysler president and Allentown native Lee Iacocca, who turned down the job, Governor Casey appointed Wofford to the seat on May 8, 1991. He had previously considered running for office, but never thought the opportunity was quite right. He thus became the first Democrat to represent Pennsylvania in the Senate since Joe Clark left office in 1969.

In the special election, held in November 1991, Wofford faced Dick Thornburgh, the former Pennsylvania Governor and U.S. Attorney General under Presidents Ronald Reagan and George H. W. Bush. Candidates for this special election were chosen by the party committees because the vacancy had happened too late to set up a primary. Wofford began the campaign so far behind in the polls that most pundits assumed he had no chance of winning. Indeed, at one point his own internal polls showed him losing by over 40 points. His eventual upset victory over the former governor by ten percentage points surprised many, and was later described as a turning point for the political prospects of President George H. W. Bush.

Wofford's campaign was run by Paul Begala and James Carville, and their dramatic success brought them to national attention. Wofford's campaign pivoted on a promise of universal healthcare, and according to political scientist Jacob Hacker, helped propel healthcare reform into national discussion. Themes such as the economy and health care would also be crucial to Bill Clinton's 1992 presidential election victory. In 2015, conservative commentator Rush Limbaugh complained of Wofford, "Health care as a right—you know who started that line of thinking? A guy named Harris Wofford, who was a senator from Pennsylvania."

Although Clinton ultimately chose Al Gore, Wofford was a finalist for the vice presidential nomination.

=== 1994 U.S. Senate defeat ===
After the failure of president Bill Clinton's Healthcare proposal, to which Wofford was tied to having been one of the executive's strongest allies on the issue, following this Wofford focused his attacks on his opponent Republican Rep. Rick Santorum, thirty-two years his junior. Santorum in turn ran a grassroots campaign and appeal to socially conservative unions. Wofford would end up narrowly losing his seat to Santorum by 87,210 votes. The election was part of that year's Republican Revolution, in which many Democrats were ousted from both houses of the United States Congress. Wofford and Tennessee's Jim Sasser were the only incumbent Senators to lose re-election in the 1994 cycle.

== Subsequent career ==
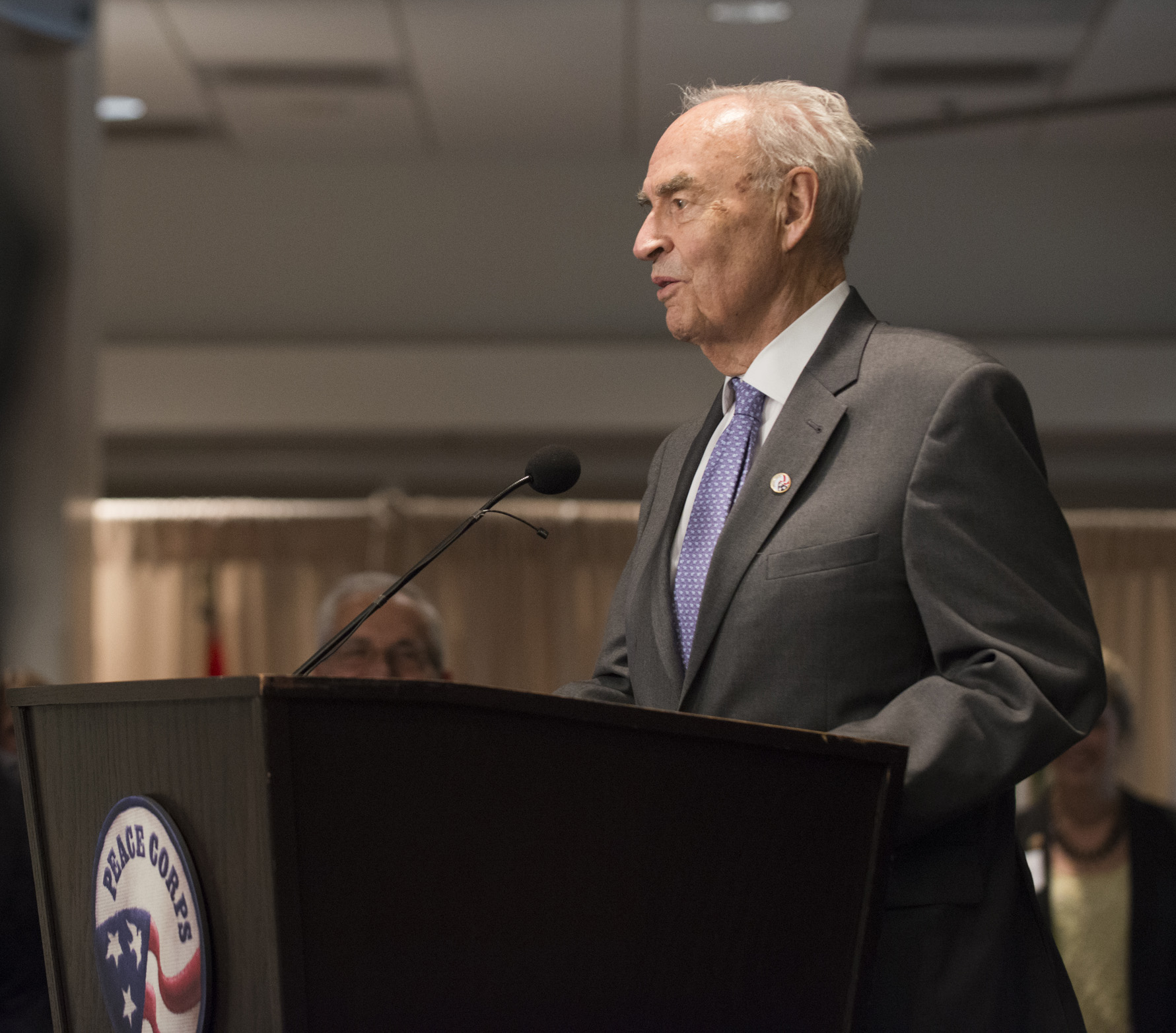
Wofford speaks at Peace Corps ceremony in 2014.

From 1995 to 2001, Wofford was chief executive officer of the Corporation for National and Community Service, the federal agency that runs AmeriCorps and other domestic volunteer programs.

In 2005, he met Barack Obama. The two became friends and when Obama made his speech on race in America, "A More Perfect Union", Wofford introduced him.

On January 4, 2007, Wofford was present for the swearing-in of Senator Bob Casey Jr., who defeated Santorum in his bid for a third term, and on January 3, 2013, Wofford again accompanied Casey to his swearing-in for a second term on the floor of the Senate.

From 2001, Wofford was on the boards of several charities and service organizations, including America's Promise, Youth Service America and the Points of Light Foundation. He was a trustee to the Martin Luther King Jr. Center for Non-Violent Social Change. Between 2007 and 2009, Wofford was the national spokesperson for Experience Wave, a national campaign that sought to advance state and federal policies to make it easier for mid-life and older adults to stay engaged in work and community life.

Wofford was a board member of Malaria No More, a New York-based nonprofit that was launched at the 2006 White House Summit with the goal of ending all deaths caused by malaria. He was on the Board of Selectors of Jefferson Awards for Public Service. He was a senior fellow at the Case Foundation in Washington, D.C.

From 2012 to 2015, Wofford was a senior advisor to the Franklin Project, a policy program of the Aspen Institute that sought to make a year of service a common opportunity and expectation for young Americans.

In 2014, The New Republic featured Wofford in its 100th Anniversary issue, in a profile titled, "The Man Who Was Everywhere".

== Personal life ==
Wofford was raised an Episcopalian and converted to Catholicism in the 1980s.

In 1948, Wofford married Clare Lindgren. The Woffords later had three children. In January 1996, Clare Wofford died of acute leukemia at age 69.

In April 2016, at the age of 90, Wofford announced that he would marry interior designer Matthew Charlton, a man 50 years his junior who had been his companion since 2001. That month, he published an opinion piece in The New York Times entitled "Finding Love Again, This Time With a Man." Wofford and Charlton married in 2016.

On January 21, 2019, Wofford died at age 92 in Washington, D.C. of complications from a fall. Approximately 1,000 people attended his memorial service held on March 3, 2019 in Cramton Auditorium at Howard University. The Howard University Choir performed and speakers included his husband, his brother, his children, Wayne A.I. Frederick, Tom Wolf, Timothy Shriver, Bob Casey Jr., Bill Clinton (via video), Paul Begala, Ghebre Selassie Mehreteab, and Peter Yarrow (via video), among others.

== Awards ==
- In 2002, Wofford was the recipient of the John W. Gardner Leadership Award.
- In 2011, in conjunction with the 50th anniversary of the Peace Corps, the National Peace Corps Association created the Harris Wofford Global Citizen Award. It is given annually to an outstanding global leader who grew up and lives in a country where Peace Corps Volunteers served and whose life was influenced by the Peace Corps. The leader should be a person whose life's work has made a significant contribution to the world in a way that reflects the core Peace Corps values of service, peace, development, human rights, health, and understanding.
- In 2012, Wofford received the Presidential Citizens Medal.

== See also ==
- List of LGBT members of the United States Congress

Academic offices
Preceded by Katharine Elizabeth McBride	President of Bryn Mawr College; 1970–1978	Succeeded by Mary Patterson McPherson
Party political offices
Preceded by Edward Mezvinsky	Chair of the Pennsylvania Democratic Party; 1986–1986	Succeeded by Larry Yatch
Preceded by Joe Vignola	Democratic nominee for U.S. Senator from Pennsylvania (Class 1); 1991, 1994	Succeeded by Ron Klink
U.S. Senate
Preceded by John Heinz	United States Senator (Class 1) from Pennsylvania; 1991–1995; Served alongside: Arlen Specter	Succeeded by Rick Santorum
