= Stanley A. McChrystal =

US Army general (born 1954)

Stanley McChrystal
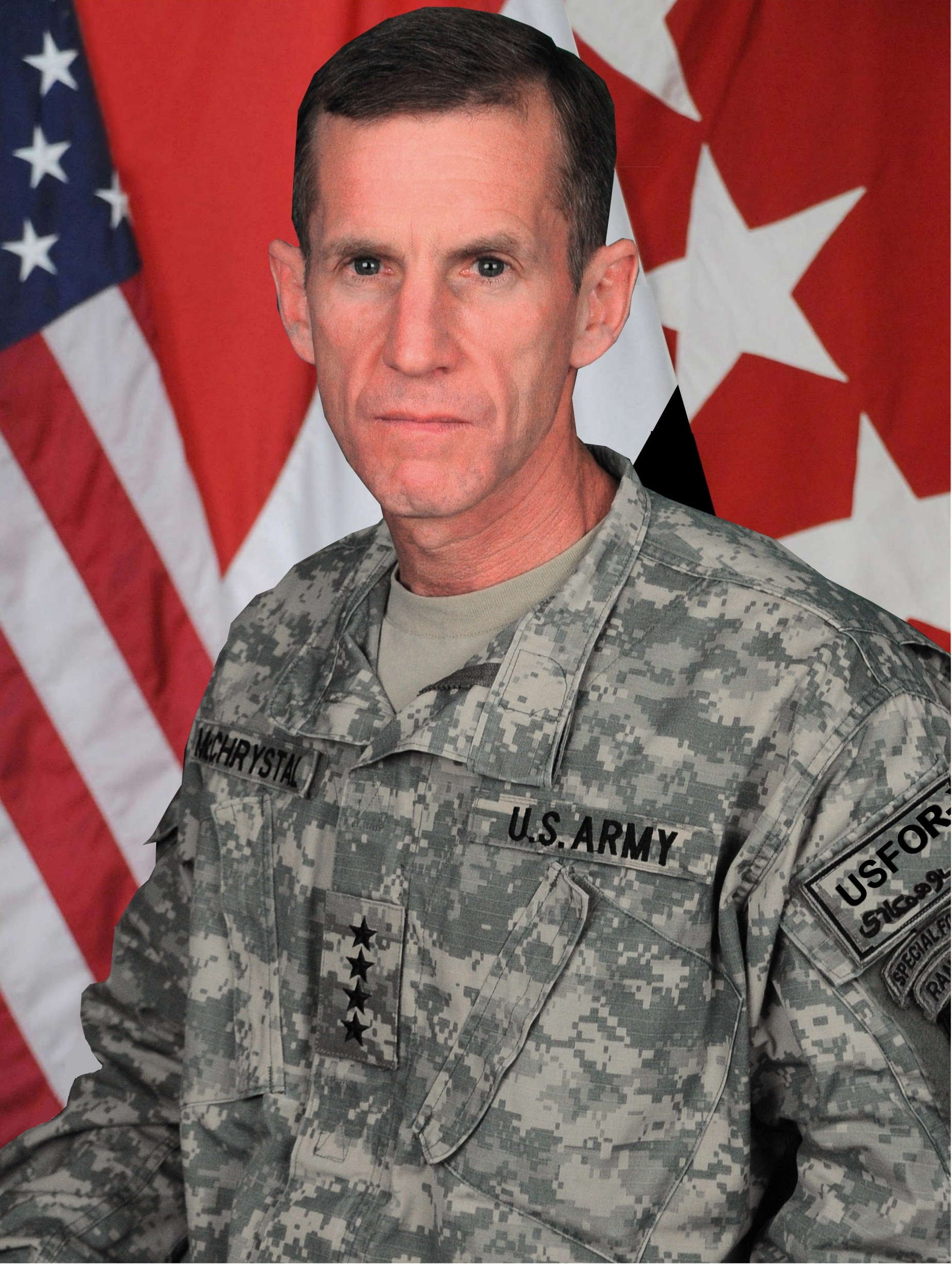
- General Stanley A. McChrystal c. 2009
- Born: 14 August 1954 (age 72); Fort Leavenworth, Kansas, U.S.
- Military career
- Allegiance: United States
- Branch: United States Army
- Service years: 1976–2010
- Rank: General
- Commands: International Security Assistance Force; Joint Special Operations Command; United States Army Central; 75th Ranger Regiment 2nd Battalion, 75th Ranger Regiment; 2nd Battalion, 504th Infantry
- Conflicts: Gulf War; Operation Desert Shield; War in Afghanistan; Iraq War
- Awards: Defense Distinguished Service Medal (2); Army Distinguished Service Medal; Defense Superior Service Medal (2); Legion of Merit (3); Bronze Star Medal

Stanley Allen McChrystal (born 14 August 1954) is a retired United States Army general best known for his command of Joint Special Operations Command (JSOC) from 2003 to 2008 during which his organization was credited with the elimination of Abu Musab al-Zarqawi, leader of al-Qaeda in Iraq. His final assignment was as Commander, International Security Assistance Force (ISAF) and Commander, United States Forces – Afghanistan (USFOR-A). He previously served as Director, Joint Staff from August 2008 to June 2009. McChrystal received criticism for his alleged role in the cover-up of the Pat Tillman friendly fire incident. McChrystal was reportedly known for saying what other military leaders were thinking but were afraid to say; this was one of the reasons cited for his appointment to lead all forces in Afghanistan. He held the post from 15 June 2009 to 23 June 2010.

Former defense secretary Robert Gates described McChrystal as "perhaps the finest warrior and leader of men in combat I ever met." However, following unflattering remarks about Vice President Joe Biden and other administration officials attributed to McChrystal and his aides in a Rolling Stone article, McChrystal was recalled to Washington, D.C., where President Barack Obama accepted his resignation as commander in Afghanistan.

His command of the International Security Assistance Force in Afghanistan was assumed by the deputy commander, British Army general Sir Nicholas Parker, pending the confirmation of a replacement. Obama named General David Petraeus as McChrystal's replacement; Petraeus was confirmed by the Senate and officially assumed command on 30 June. Days after being relieved of his duties in Afghanistan, McChrystal announced his retirement. Since 2010, he has taught courses in international relations at Yale University as a Senior Fellow of the university's Jackson Institute for Global Affairs.

== Early career ==
Born on the Fort Leavenworth U.S. Army base in Kansas, McChrystal graduated high school from St. John's College High School in Washington, D.C. He graduated from the United States Military Academy in 1976 and was commissioned as a second lieutenant in the United States Army. His initial assignment was to Company C, 1st Battalion, 504th Infantry, 82nd Airborne Division, serving as weapons platoon leader from November 1976 to February 1978, as rifle platoon leader from February 1978 to July 1978, and as executive officer from July 1978 to November 1978.

In November 1978, McChrystal enrolled as a student in the Special Forces Officer Course at the Special Forces School at Fort Bragg, North Carolina. Upon completing the course in April 1979, he remained at Fort Bragg as commander of Operational Detachment A-714 (an "A-team") in Company A, 1st Battalion, 7th Special Forces Group (Airborne). This was not the last time that '714' would be associated with McChrystal. In June 1980, he attended the Infantry Officer Advanced Course at the Infantry School at Fort Benning, Georgia, until February 1981.

In February 1981, McChrystal moved to South Korea as intelligence and operations officer (S-2/S-3) for the United Nations Command Support Group—Joint Security Area. He reported to Fort Stewart, Georgia, in March 1982 to serve as training officer in the Directorate of Plans and Training, A Company, Headquarters Command. He moved to 3rd Battalion, 19th Infantry, 24th Infantry Division (Mechanized), in November 1982, where he commanded A Company before becoming battalion operations officer (S-3) in September 1984.

McChrystal moved to 3rd Battalion, 75th Ranger Regiment, as battalion liaison officer in September 1985, became commander of A Company in January 1986, served again as battalion liaison officer in May 1987, and finally became battalion operations officer (S-3) in April 1988, before reporting to the Naval War College in Newport, Rhode Island, as a student in the Command and General Staff Course in June 1989. It was during this time that McChrystal also completed a Master of Science degree in international relations from Salve Regina University. After completing the course in June 1990, he was assigned as Army Special Operations action officer, J-3, Joint Special Operations Command until April 1993, in which capacity he deployed to Saudi Arabia for Operations Desert Shield and Desert Storm.

From April 1993 to November 1994, McChrystal commanded the 2nd Battalion, 504th Infantry, 82nd Airborne Division. He then commanded the 2nd Battalion, 75th Ranger Regiment, from November 1994 to June 1996. During this time he initiated what would become a complete revamping of the existing Army hand-to-hand combat curricula. After a year as a senior service college fellow at the John F. Kennedy School of Government at Harvard University, he moved up to command the entire 75th Ranger Regiment from June 1997 to August 1999, then spent another year as a military fellow at the Council on Foreign Relations.

== General officer ==
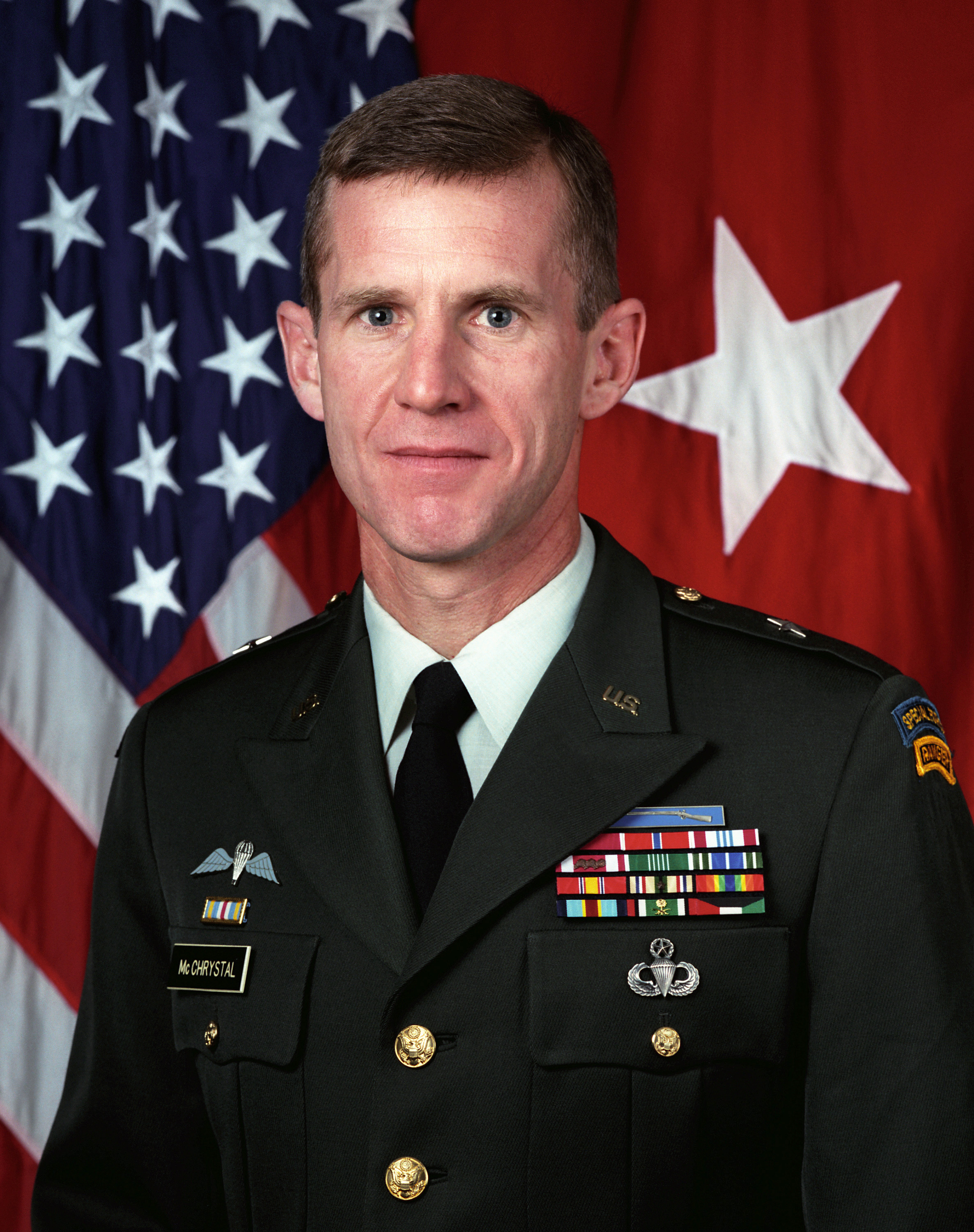
McChrystal as a brigadier general

Promoted to brigadier general on 1 January 2001, he served as assistant division commander (operations) of the 82nd Airborne Division from June 2000 to June 2001, including duty as Commander, Coalition/Joint Task Force Kuwait, part of United States Army Central, in Camp Doha, Kuwait. From June 2001 to July 2002 he was chief of staff of XVIII Airborne Corps, including duty as chief of staff of Combined Joint Task Force 180, the headquarters formation contributed by XVIII Airborne Corps to direct all Operation Enduring Freedom operations in Afghanistan.

At the beginning of the Iraq War in March 2003, he was serving in the Pentagon as a member of the Joint Staff, where he had been vice director of operations, J-3, since July 2002. McChrystal was selected to deliver nationally televised Pentagon briefings on U.S. military operations in Iraq, including one in April 2003 shortly after the fall of Baghdad in which he announced, "I would anticipate that the major combat engagements are over."

=== Commander, Joint Special Operations Command ===
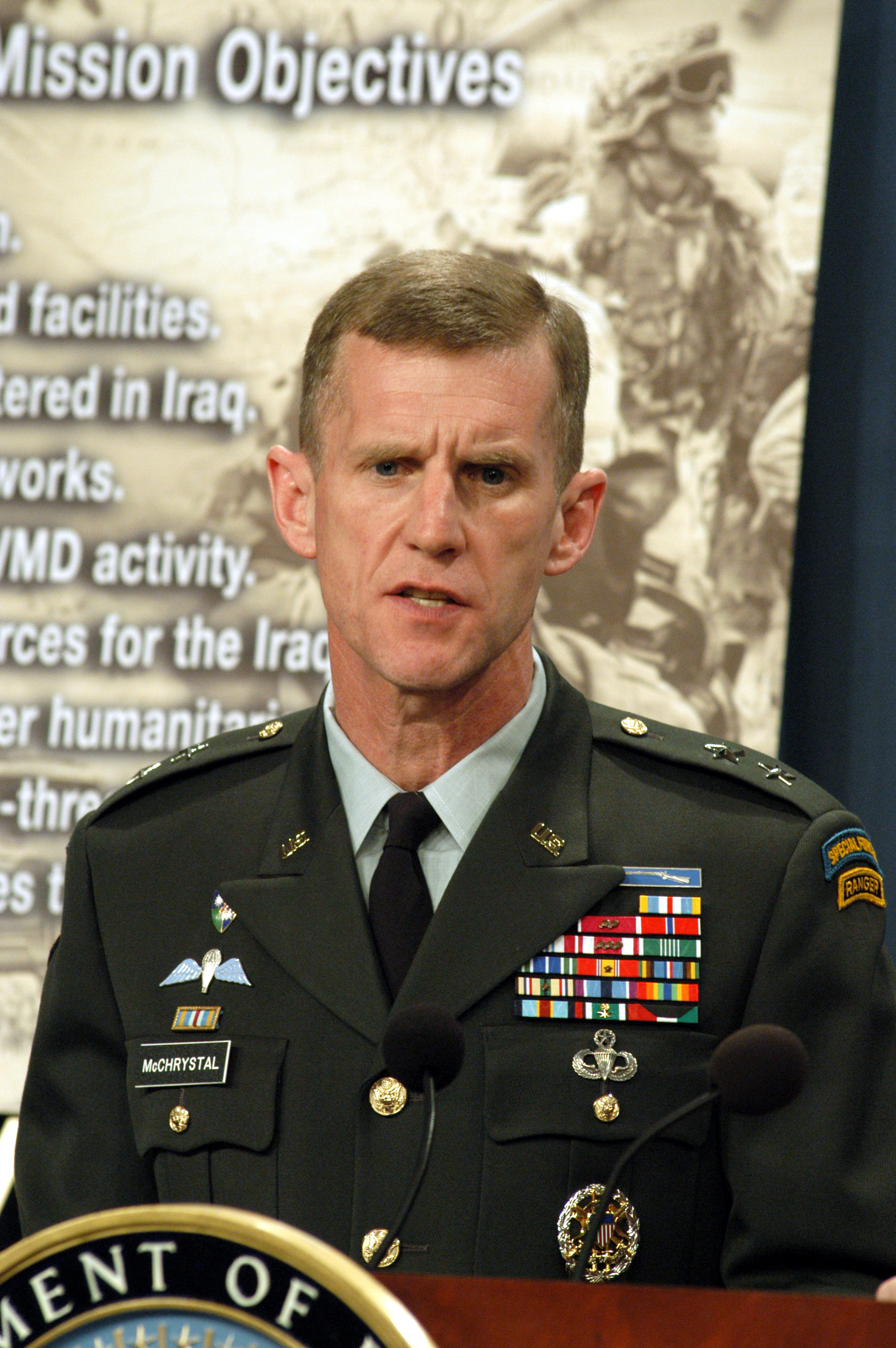
McChrystal at the Pentagon in April 2003, giving a briefing regarding the Iraq War

McChrystal commanded the Joint Special Operations Command (JSOC) for five years, serving first as Commanding General, Joint Special Operations Command, from September 2003 to February 2006, and then as Commander, Joint Special Operations Command/Commander, Joint Special Operations Command Forward, from February 2006 to August 2008. He took command of JSOC on 6 October 2003. This position he describes as commander of Task Force 714 in his autobiography, a force which has been identified as the JSOC high-value targets task force.

Nominally assigned to Fort Bragg, North Carolina, he spent most of his time in Afghanistan, at U.S. Central Command's forward headquarters in Qatar, and in Iraq. In Iraq, he personally directed special operations, where his work there is viewed as "pivotal". Early successes included the capture by JSOC forces of Saddam Hussein in December 2003. He was promoted to lieutenant general on 16 February 2006.

Joint Special Operations Command emblem

As head of what Newsweek termed "the most secretive force in the U.S. military", McChrystal maintained a very low profile until June 2006, when his forces were responsible for the death of Abu Musab al-Zarqawi, leader of Al-Qaeda in Iraq. After McChrystal's team successfully located Zarqawi and called in the airstrike that killed him, McChrystal accompanied his men to the bombed-out hut near Baqubah to personally identify the body.

McChrystal's Zarqawi unit, Task Force 6-26, became well known for its interrogation methods, particularly at Camp Nama, where it was accused of abusing detainees. After the Abu Ghraib torture and prisoner abuse scandal became public in April 2004, 34 members of the task force were disciplined. McChrystal later said that, "we found that nearly every first-time jihadist claimed Abu Ghraib had first jolted him into action." He also said that, "mistreating detainees would discredit us. ... The pictures [from] Abu Ghraib represented a setback for America's efforts in Iraq. Simultaneously undermining U.S. domestic confidence in the way in which America was operating, and creating or reinforcing negative perceptions worldwide of American values, it fueled violence".

McChrystal was also criticized for his role in the aftermath of the 2004 death by friendly fire of Ranger and former professional football player Pat Tillman. Within a day of Tillman's death, McChrystal was notified that Tillman was a victim of friendly fire. Shortly thereafter, McChrystal was put in charge of paperwork to award Tillman a posthumous Silver Star for valor.

On 28 April 2004, six days after Tillman's death, McChrystal approved a final draft of the Silver Star recommendation and submitted it to the acting Secretary of the Army, even though the medal recommendation deliberately omitted any mention of friendly fire, included the phrase "in the line of devastating enemy fire", and was accompanied by fabricated witness statements. On 29 April, McChrystal sent an urgent memo warning White House speechwriters not to quote the medal recommendation in any statements they wrote for President George W. Bush because it "might cause public embarrassment if the circumstances of Corporal Tillman's death become public." McChrystal was one of the first to caution restraint in public statements, until the investigation was complete. McChrystal was one of eight officers recommended for discipline by a subsequent Pentagon investigation, but the Army declined to take action against him.

According to Pulitzer Prize-winning Washington Post reporter Bob Woodward, beginning in late spring 2007 JSOC and CIA Special Activities Division teams launched a new series of highly effective covert operations that coincided with the Iraq War troop surge of 2007. They did this by killing or capturing many of the key al-Qaeda leaders in Iraq. In a CBS 60 Minutes interview, Woodward described a new special operations capability that allowed for this success, noting that it was developed by the joint teams of CIA and JSOC. Several senior U.S. officials stated that the "joint efforts of JSOC and CIA paramilitary units were the most significant contributor to the defeat of al-Qa'ida in Iraq." Journalist Peter Bergen also credits McChrystal with transforming and modernizing JSOC into a "force of unprecedented agility and lethality," playing a key factor in the success of JSOC efforts in subsequent years and in the success of the war in Iraq.

=== Director, Joint Staff ===
McChrystal was considered a candidate to succeed General Bryan D. Brown as commander of U.S. Special Operations Command in 2007, and to succeed General David Petraeus as commanding general of Multi-National Force – Iraq or Admiral William J. Fallon as commander of U.S. Central Command in 2008, all four-star positions. Instead, McChrystal was nominated by George W. Bush to succeed Lieutenant General Walter L. Sharp as director of the Joint Staff in February 2008, another three-star position.

Normally a routine process, McChrystal's Senate confirmation was stalled by members of the Senate Armed Services Committee who sought more information about the alleged mistreatment of detainees by Special Operations troops under McChrystal's command in Iraq and Afghanistan. After meeting with McChrystal in private, the Senate Armed Services Committee confirmed his reappointment as lieutenant general in May 2008 and he became director of the Joint Staff in August 2008.

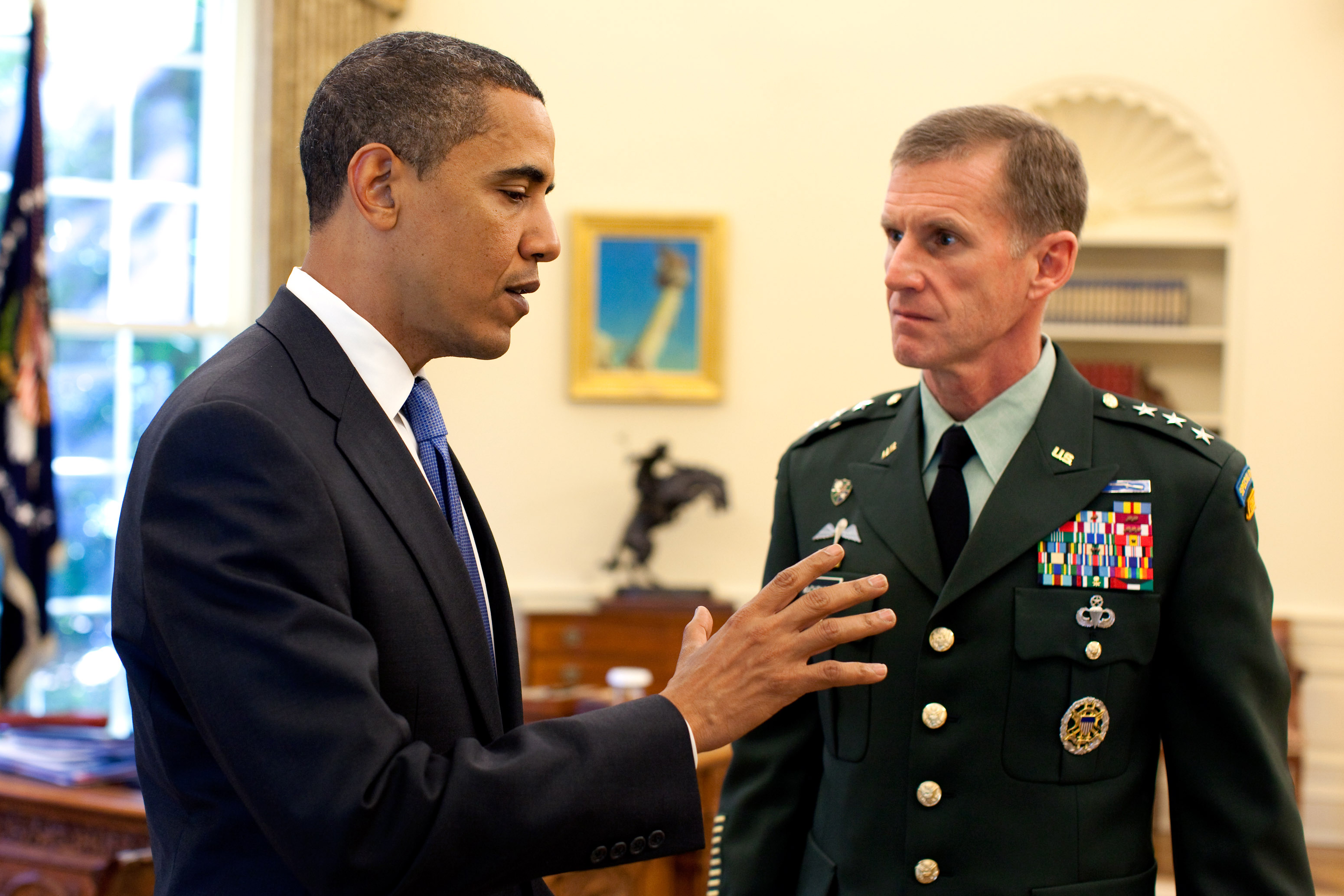
President Obama and McChrystal in the Oval Office in May 2009

=== Commander of US and ISAF forces in Afghanistan ===
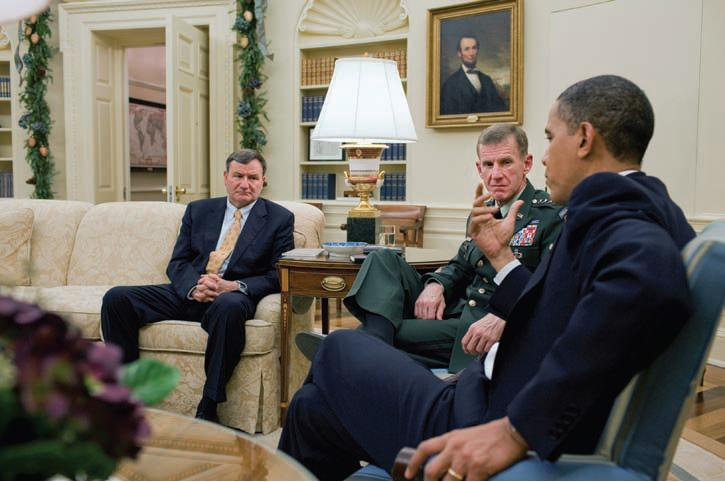
McChrystal meeting with President Obama and Ambassador Eikenberry in December 2009

With his 10 June 2009, Senate approval to take command in Afghanistan, McChrystal was promoted to general. Shortly after McChrystal assumed command of NATO operations, Operation Khanjar commenced, marking the largest offensive operation and the beginning of the deadliest combat month for NATO forces since 2001.

==== Afghanistan assessment made public ====
McChrystal submitted a 66-page report to Defense Secretary Robert Gates calling for more troops in Afghanistan, saying "We are going to win." That became public on 20 September 2009. McChrystal warned that the war in Afghanistan might be lost if more troops were not sent, but the report ends on a note of cautious optimism: "While the situation is serious, success is still achievable."

==== Recommended troop increases ====
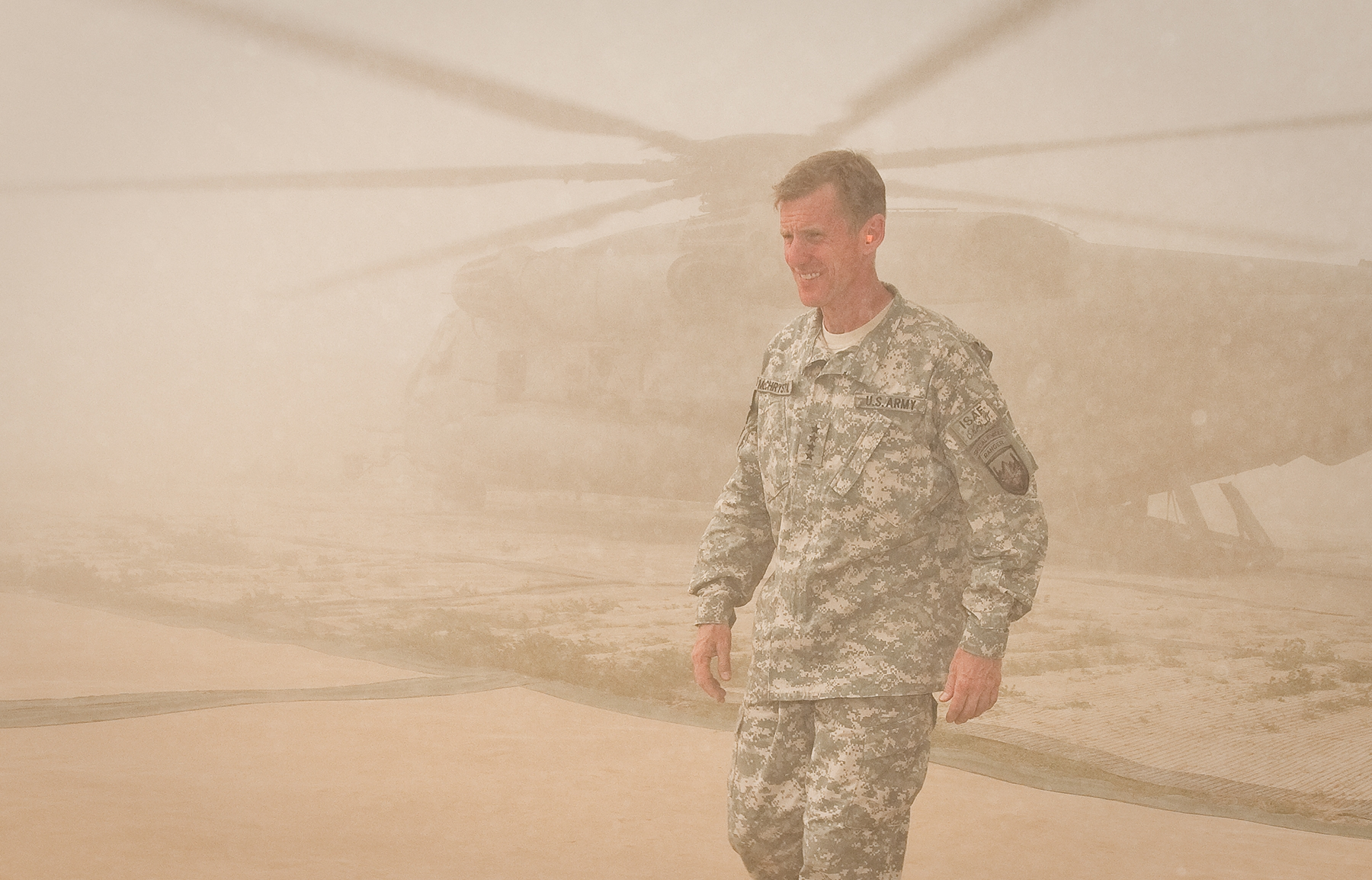
General McChrystal arrives at Combat Outpost Sharp in Garmsir District in April 2010

In 2009, McChrystal publicly suggested between 30,000 and 40,000 more troops were needed in Afghanistan, as the lowest risk option out of a number of possible troop level changes. He was advised by White House Staff not to present troop increases to "defeat the Taliban", but to "degrade" them.

Scott Ritter, former Chief UN Weapons Inspector in Iraq, stated at the time that McChrystal should be fired for insubordination for disclosing information that he should have said only in private to the President of the United States.

New York magazine refers to the leaked report as the "McChrystal risk" as it boxed Obama into a corner about boosting troop levels in Afghanistan.

==== Rolling Stone article and resignation ====
In an article written by freelance journalist Michael Hastings ("The Runaway General", appearing in Rolling Stone magazine, July 8–22, 2010, issue), McChrystal and his staff mocked civilian government officials, including Joe Biden, national security advisor James L. Jones, US ambassador to Afghanistan Karl W. Eikenberry, and special representative for Afghanistan and Pakistan Richard Holbrooke. McChrystal was not quoted as being directly critical of the president or the president's policies, but several comments from his aides in the article reflected their perception of McChrystal's disappointment with President Obama after their first two meetings.

According to Rolling Stone, McChrystal's staff was contacted prior to release of the article and did not deny the validity of the article, although senior members of his staff dispute this, and have accused Hastings in Army Times of exaggerating the seniority of aides quoted and breaking the off the record trust of private conversations between him and the aides.

Hastings told Newsweek that he was quite clearly a reporter gathering material, and actually bemused at the degree to which soldiers freely spoke to him. A report by the Department of Defense inspector general finds "Not all of the events at issue occurred as reported in [Hastings's] article."

The statements attributed to McChrystal and members of his staff drew the attention of the White House when McChrystal called Vice President Biden to apologize. McChrystal issued a written statement, saying:

I extend my sincerest apology for this profile. It was a mistake reflecting poor judgment and should never have happened. Throughout my career, I have lived by the principles of personal honor and professional integrity. What is reflected in this article falls far short of that standard. I have enormous respect and admiration for President Obama and his national security team, and for the civilian leaders and troops fighting this war and I remain committed to ensuring its successful outcome.

Biden's call to President Obama to tell him of the apology prompted Obama to request a copy of the profile and then to summon McChrystal to attend in person the president's monthly security team meeting at the White House in lieu of attending via secure video teleconference. During a meeting with Obama on June 23, two days before the article was released to newsstands and only one day after it was released online, McChrystal tendered his resignation, which the president accepted. Shortly thereafter, President Obama nominated General David Petraeus to replace McChrystal in his role as top commander in Afghanistan.

Obama's statement on the topic began as follows: "Today I accepted Gen. Stanley McChrystal's resignation as commander of the International Security Assistance Force in Afghanistan. I did so with considerable regret, but also with certainty that it is the right thing for our mission in Afghanistan, for our military and for our country."

Later that day, McChrystal released the following statement:

This morning the president accepted my resignation as Commander of U.S. and NATO Coalition Forces in Afghanistan. I strongly support the president's strategy in Afghanistan and am deeply committed to our coalition forces, our partner nations, and the Afghan people. It was out of respect for this commitment—and a desire to see the mission succeed—that I tendered my resignation. It has been my privilege and honor to lead our nation's finest.

=== Retirement ===
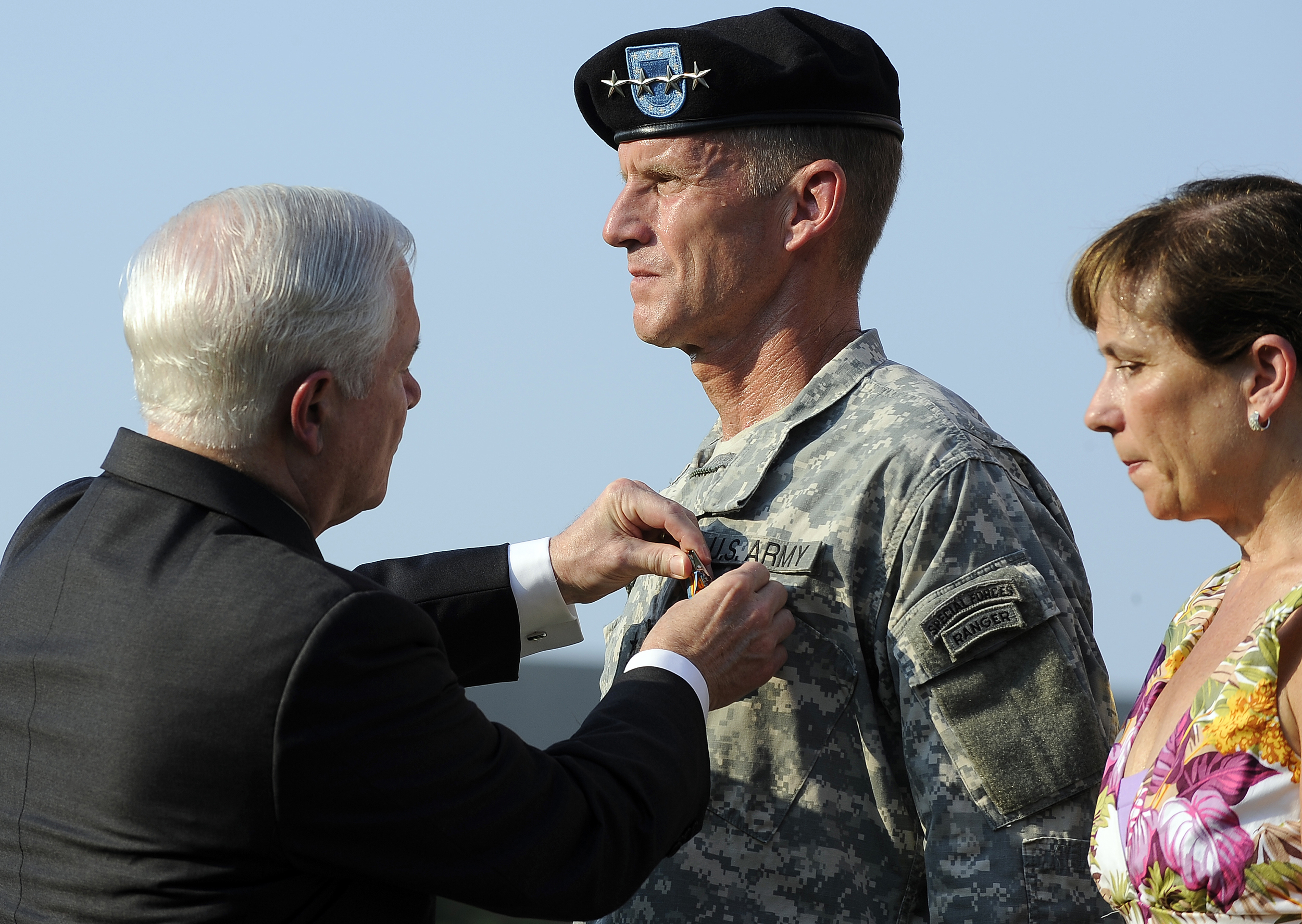
Gates decorates McChrystal with the Defense Distinguished Service Medal at his retirement ceremony on 23 July 2010

Shortly after his removal from command in Afghanistan, McChrystal announced that he would retire from the Army. The day after the announcement, the White House announced that he would retain his four-star rank in retirement, although law generally requires a four-star officer to hold his rank for three years in order to retain it in retirement. His retirement ceremony was held on July 23, 2010, at Fort McNair in Washington D.C. During this ceremony, McChrystal was awarded the Distinguished Service Medal by Army Chief of Staff Gen. George Casey and the Defense Distinguished Service Medal by Secretary of Defense Robert Gates.

=== Pentagon inquiry ===
Hastings and Eric Bates, executive editor of Rolling Stone, repeatedly defended the accuracy of Hastings' article. An inquiry by the Defense Department inspector general found no evidence of wrongdoing by McChrystal or his military and civilian associates. The Pentagon report also challenged the accuracy of Hastings' article, disputing key incidents or comments reported in it.

The report from the inquiry states: "In some instances, we found no witness who acknowledged making or hearing the comments as reported. In other instances, we confirmed that the general substance of an incident at issue occurred, but not in the exact context described in the article." In response, Rolling Stone stated that "the report by the Pentagon's inspector general offers no credible source—or indeed, any named source—contradicting the facts as reported in our story."

After the report was made public, the White House tapped McChrystal to head a new advisory board to support military families, an initiative led by First Lady Michelle Obama and Jill Biden, wife of the vice president. The selection of McChrystal was announced on 12 April, four days after the inspector general's report was finished.

== Post-military career ==
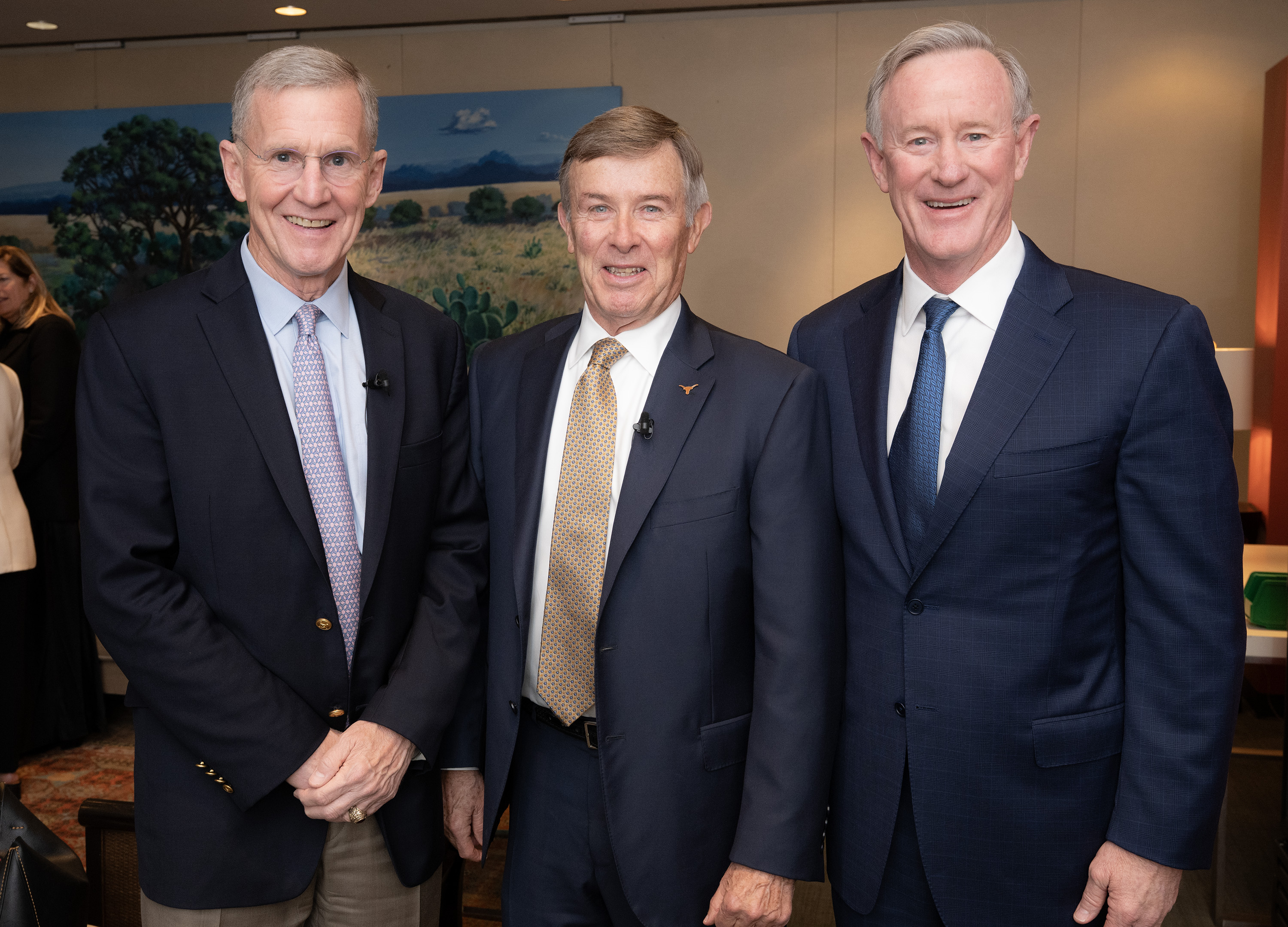
McChrystal with Joseph Maguire and William H. McRaven at the Lyndon Baines Johnson Library and Museum in November 2025

In 2010, after leaving the Army, McChrystal joined Yale University as a Jackson Institute for Global Affairs senior fellow. He teaches a course entitled "Leadership", a graduate-level seminar with some spots reserved for undergraduates. The course received 250 applications for 20 spots in 2011 and was taught for a third time in 2013.

In November 2010, JetBlue Airways announced that McChrystal would join its board of directors. On 16 February 2011, Navistar International announced that McChrystal would join its board of directors.

McChrystal is chairman of the Board of Siemens Government Technologies, and is on the strategic advisory board of Knowledge International, a licensed arms dealer whose parent company is EAI, a business "very close" to the United Arab Emirates government. He co-founded and is a partner at McChrystal Group, an Alexandria, Virginia–based consulting firm.

In 2011, McChrystal joined Spirit of America, a 501(c)(3) organization that supports the safety and success of Americans serving abroad and the local people and partners they seek to help, as an Advisory Board Member.

McChrystal's memoir, My Share of the Task, published by Portfolio of the Penguin Group, was released on 7 January 2013. The autobiography had been scheduled to be released in November 2012, but was delayed due to security clearance approvals required from the Department of Defense.

He established a consultancy firm, McChrystal Group, in 2011 which uses the slogan "Bringing Lessons from the Battlefield to Boardroom". It includes researchers, practitioners and former military officers.

In 2015, McChrystal's second book Team of Teams was released and aimed at business organizations and their leaders. With his co-authors, Tantum Collins, David Silverman and Chris Fussell, McChrystal describes his work on the Joint Special Operations Task Force in the Middle East.

In January 2016, McChrystal became the chair of the Board of Service Year Alliance—an organization merged from ServiceNation, the Franklin Project at The Aspen Institute, and the Service Year Exchange. Service Year Alliance aims to make a year of full-time service—a service year—a common expectation and opportunity for young Americans of all backgrounds. McChrystal called on the 2016 presidential candidates to embrace practical solutions to restore social trust in the United States "such as engaging young Americans in a year or more of national service." He has also said, "A service year that teaches young Americans the habits of citizenship and the power of working in teams to build trust is one of the most powerful ways this generation can help restore political and civic responsibility—and in the process help to heal a wounded nation."

In 2016, FiscalNote announced that McChrystal had joined the company's board of directors.

In May 2016, McChrystal was a commencement speaker at The Citadel and received an honorary Doctor of Military Science degree.

After speculation that he might be considered for Republican Donald Trump's running mate in the 2016 presidential election, McChrystal made it known that he would "decline consideration for any role" in a Trump administration. On 16 November 2016, McChrystal rejected an offer to be president-elect Trump's first choice of Secretary of Defense.

In May 2020, The Washington Post reported: that McChrystal was advising Defeat Disinfo, a new political action committee that supported the Democratic Party. Defeat Disinfo aimed to use technology to oppose Trump, particularly his handling of the coronavirus pandemic.

McChrystal endorsed Democratic nominee Joe Biden in the 2020 presidential election, and Democratic nominee Kamala Harris in the 2024 presidential election.

McChrystal has a chapter giving advice in Tim Ferriss' book Tools of Titans. In May 2025, he released the book On Character: Choices That Define a Life.

Following President Trump's Executive Order 14183 banning transgender people from military service, McChrystal presided over the retirement ceremony for Colonel Bree Fram, Lieutenant Colonel Erin Krizek, Commander Blake Dremann, Sergeant First Class Cathrine Schmid, and Chief Petty Officer Jaida McGuire.

== Personal life ==
McChrystal is the son of Major General Herbert J. McChrystal (1924–2013), and his wife, Mary Gardner Bright (1925–1971). His grandfather was US Army Colonel Herbert J. McChrystal Sr. (1895–1954). He is the fourth child in a family of five boys and one girl, all of whom would serve in the military or became military spouses. His older brother, Colonel Scott McChrystal, is a retired Army chaplain, and is the endorsing agent for the Assemblies of God. He is a distant relative of Corporal Charles Edward McChrystal (1922–1944), US Army Corporal and Purple Heart recipient, who died in France during World War II.

McChrystal married Annie Corcoran, also from a military family, in 1977.

Dates of Rank
Insignia	Rank	Date
	2LT	2 June 1976
	1LT	3 June 1978
	CPT	1 August 1980
	MAJ	1 July 1987
	LTC	1 September 1992
	COL	1 September 1996
	BG	1 January 2001
	MG	1 May 2004
	LTG	16 February 2006
	GEN	15 June 2009

== Awards and decorations ==
According to Council on Foreign Relations:

Personal decorations
Defense Distinguished Service Medal with oak leaf cluster
Army Distinguished Service Medal
Defense Superior Service Medal with oak leaf cluster
Legion of Merit with two oak leaf clusters
Bronze Star
Defense Meritorious Service Medal
Meritorious Service Medal with three oak leaf clusters
Army Commendation Medal
Army Achievement Medal
National Defense Service Medal with one bronze service star
Armed Forces Expeditionary Medal
Southwest Asia Service Medal with two service stars
Afghanistan Campaign Medal
Iraq Campaign Medal
Global War on Terrorism Expeditionary Medal
Global War on Terrorism Service Medal
Korean Defense Service Medal
Humanitarian Service Medal
Army Service Ribbon
Army Overseas Service Ribbon
Kuwait Liberation Medal (Saudi Arabia)
Kuwait Liberation Medal (Kuwait)
Unit awards
Joint Meritorious Unit Award

Other accoutrements
Expert Infantryman Badge
Master Parachutist Badge
Special Forces Tab
Ranger Tab
United States Special Operations Command; Combat Service Identification Badge
75th Ranger Regiment; Distinctive unit insignia
Parachutist Badge (United Kingdom)
Joint Chiefs of Staff Identification Badge

== Published works ==
- McChrystal, Stanley (2013). My Share of the Task: A Memoir. New York: Portfolio/Penguin. ISBN 9781591844754. OCLC 780480413.
- McChrystal, Stanley; Collins, Tantum; Silverman, David; Fussell, Chris (2015). Team of Teams: New Rules of Engagement for a Complex World. New York: Portfolio/Penguin. ISBN 9781591847489. OCLC 881094064.
- McChrystal, Stanley; Eggers, Jeff; Mangone, Jason (2018). Leaders: Myth and Reality. New York: Portfolio/Penguin. ISBN 9780525534372.
- McChrystal, Stanley; Butrico, Anna (2021). Risk: A User's Guide. Portfolio. ISBN 978-0593192207.
- McChrystal, Stanley (2025). On Character: Choices that Define a Life. Portfolio. ISBN 978-0593852958.

== See also ==
- The Operators (book)
- War Machine (film)

Military offices
Preceded by William Leszczynski	Commander of the 75th Ranger Regiment; 1997–1999	Succeeded by Ken Keen
Preceded by Dell Dailey	Commander of the Joint Special Operations Command; 2003–2008	Succeeded by William McRaven
Preceded by David McKiernan	Commander of the International Security Assistance Force; 2009–2010	Succeeded by David Petraeus
