= Richelle Parham =

American marketing executive

Richelle Parham is an American marketer, and the former vice president and chief marketing officer for eBay.

== Early life ==
Richelle Parham grew up in Baltimore, Maryland. Growing up, she planned to become a fashion designer. As part of a co-op placement while attending Drexel University, Parham worked at Valentino in New York City. She graduated from Drexel University with two bachelor's degrees, one in marketing and the other in design and merchandising.

== Career ==
Parham began her career in telemarketing at Citibank. She then spent thirteen years at Digitas, where she held a number of roles, including senior vice president and general manager of the Chicago office. Following Digitas, she served as a marketing executive at Visa, overseeing the company's global marketing services. In 2010, Parham left Visa to become vice president and chief marketing officer for eBay North America. Parham left eBay in 2015 amid organizational restructuring. In 2016, LabCorp named Parham to their board of directors. In 2018, she was appointed to the Best Buy board of directors. She has also served on the board of directors of the Scripps Network since 2012, and serves as an advisor for Girls Who Code. Parham joined the Drexel University board of trustees in May 2014.

== Awards ==
Parham was given the 2012 Women of Influence Award by the Silicon Valley / San Jose Business Journal. In 2013, she was named to the Direct Marketing News Marketing Hall of Femme, and listed by Black Enterprise as a "Top 12 Innovator of Marketing and Advertising". In 2014, Parham was named by Forbes as one of the "50 Most Influential CMOs in the World", by Fast Company as one of the "Most Creative People in Business 1000", and by Savoy as one of the "Top 100 Most Influential Blacks in Corporate America". In 2016, Parham was included in Savoy's "Power 300, Most Influential Black Corporate Directors".
