= Mary Patterson McPherson =

- Education: Smith College (BA, LLD); University of Delaware (MA); Bryn Mawr College (PhD)
- Organization(s): Bryn Mawr College, Andrew W. Mellon Foundation, American Philosophical Society
- Known for: Educator, sixth President of Bryn Mawr College

External videos
- Mary Patterson McPherson Awarded Honorary Doctorate at DePauw Commencement, 2004

Mary Patterson McPherson (born c. 1935) has served as the president of Bryn Mawr College (1978–1997), the vice president of the Andrew W. Mellon Foundation (1997–2007), and the executive officer of the American Philosophical Society (2007–2012). She is considered to be "a significant figure in American higher education and a leader in the education of women".

McPherson is widely credited with renewing and revitalizing Bryn Mawr and enhancing its stature during a time when the role of women's colleges was being challenged.

== Education ==
McPherson attended school at Agnes Irwin School in Rosemont. She received her B.A. and L.L.D. from Smith College, an M.A. from the University of Delaware, and a Ph.D. from Bryn Mawr.

== Work ==
McPherson taught philosophy at the University of Delaware and served as professor and dean at Bryn Mawr before being elected president of Bryn Mawr College, from 1978 to 1997. Her inauguration at Bryn Mawr College marked the first time that all the presidents of the Seven Sisters colleges were women.

McPherson served as vice president of the Andrew W. Mellon Foundation from October 1997 to February 2007.

She was named the executive officer of the American Philosophical Society, the oldest learned society in the United States in 2007. She has been a member of the society since her election to membership in 1983.

MacPherson has also served on the boards of many institutions, including several schools and colleges, JSTOR, the Josiah Macy, Jr. Foundation, the Carnegie Foundation for the Advancement of Teaching, the Philadelphia Museum of Art, the Brookings Institution, the American Council on Education, and the National Humanities Center.

== Awards ==
- Honorary Doctor of Humane Letters degree from Mount Holyoke College, May 2, 2000
- M. Carey Thomas Award, 2002
- Honorary Doctor of Letters degree from DePauw University, May 23, 2004
- Honorary Doctor of Humane Letters degree from the University of Delaware, January 10, 2009
- The McPherson Fund For Excellence was established at Bryn Mawr in 1997 to honor president emeritus McPherson, recognizing McPherson Fellows for "excellence and service to the community, either within or beyond the boundaries of [the] institution".
