= Service Year Alliance =

- Founded: 2016; 10 years ago
- Type: Charitable organization
- Location: Washington, D.C.
- Key people: Stanley A. McChrystal (Board Chair); Jesse Colvin (CEO)
- Website: www.serviceyearalliance.org

Service Year Alliance is an American nonprofit organization headquartered in Washington, D.C.

== History ==
The organization was formed in 2016 through the merging of three historical national service efforts (the Franklin Project at the Aspen Institute, Service Nation, and the Service Year Exchange project of the National Conference on Citizenship).

In March 2018, the organization acquired the AmeriCorps Alums program from Points of Light.

== Campaigns ==
=== Stop National Service Extinction ===
In 2017, Service Year Alliance launched a campaign to save funding for national service. The campaign culminated on August 30, with over one hundred volunteers dressed in inflatable dinosaur costumes across Washington, D.C.

=== Let National Service Soar ===
In 2018, Service Year Alliance launched a campaign to grow funding for national service. The campaign culminated on May 7, with over one hundred volunteers dressed in inflatable eagle costumes across Washington, D.C.

=== Serve America Together ===
Serve America Together was a campaign connected to the 2020 United States presidential election in an effort to make national service more prominent. Its coalition partners included the Student Veterans of America, The Mission Continues, the National Peace Corps Association, YouthBuild and Teach for America. The co-chairs of the campaign were Stanley McChrystal, Arianna Huffington, Robert Gates, Laura Lauder, Andrew Hauptman and Deval Patrick. On July 8, 2019, Pete Buttigieg became the first candidate to accept the Serve America Together challenge; on August 27, 2019, Kirsten Gillibrand became the second candidate; and on September 17, 2019, Tom Steyer became the third candidate.

== Initiatives ==
=== National Service and American Democracy ===
In 2019, Service Year Alliance partnered with Arizona State University to create a three-credit online and in-person course called National Service and American Democracy about American democracy and civic engagement.

=== Service + Tech ===
Service Year Alliance launched the Service + Tech initiative on December 11, 2018. with funding provided by Schmidt Futures, SAP, and Cisco. The founding corporations were the Corporation for National and Community Service, AmeriCorps, Teach For America, City Year, Reading & Math Inc., Public Allies, the National Peace Corps Association, and Citizen Schools. The founding training partners were Per Scholas, Make School, General Assembly, Northeaster's Align Program, Code for America, and LinkedIn.
