= Public Allies =

American nonprofit organization

- Founded: 1992
- Founder: Vanessa Kirsch and Katrina Browne
- Key people: Jenise Terrell, CEO
- Website: www.publicallies.org

Public Allies is an American nonprofit organization that operates an AmeriCorps program and is dedicated to leadership development. Its mission is to create a just and equitable society and the diverse leadership to sustain it.

== History ==
Public Allies was founded in 1992 by Vanessa Kirsch and Katrina Browne, college graduates who wanted to challenge the notion that their generation was apathetic and uncaring. Grounded in the belief that the untapped energy and idealism of young people can be a powerful force for transforming communities, Kirsch and Browne created Public Allies to provide a pipeline for diverse young leaders to begin careers in public life.

The first Public Allies program was launched in Washington, D.C., with 14 Allies (members), with funding from the John D. and Catherine T. MacArthur Foundation and Surdna Foundation. Its first year, the program also received a demonstration grant from the Commission for National and Community Service, under President George H. W. Bush.

In 1993, Public Allies Chicago was launched with 30 Allies under the leadership of founding Executive Director Michelle Obama. She served as Chicago director until 1996, and then as a national board member from 1997 to 2001. Also in 1993, President Bill Clinton named Public Allies as a model for national service.

In 1994, Public Allies, along with Habitat for Humanity and YouthBuild, were among the first recipients of AmeriCorps grants, which allowed for expansion to Delaware, Milwaukee, and North Carolina. In 1995, Public Allies opened a site Silicon Valley and San Francisco, followed by Cincinnati (1998), New York and Los Angeles (1999), and Eagle Rock, Colorado (2002). Additional sites include Connecticut (2004); Arizona and Pittsburgh (2006); Miami, New Mexico, and San Antonio (2007); Indianapolis and Maryland (2009); Central Florida and the Twin Cities (2010); and Detroit and Iowa (2013).

In 2023, Jenise Terrell was appointed CEO, replacing, Jaime E. Uzeta, who served since 2018, Adren O. Wilson, Ph.D., who served since 2014, and Paul Schmitz, who had served since 2000.

Public Allies has over 10,000 alumni and more than 3,000 community partners nationwide.

== Logo ==
The Public Allies logo draws on Indigenous tradition to illustrate the impact individuals can have on their world. The handprint depicted in the logo represents the mark that people leave on their communities and on the people they touch in the course of their lives. The red swirl stands for the energy and idealism that drive people to serve their communities. The seven rays refer to a philosophy regarding the interconnectedness of the generations—the belief that an individual living today has been influenced by the three preceding generations and that the individual will go on to leave a legacy impacting the three generations to follow.

== Mission and programs ==
Public Allies' mission is to create a just and equitable society and the diverse leadership to sustain it. Their stated aim is to change the face and practice of leadership in communities across the country by demonstrating our conviction that everyone can lead, and that lasting social change results when citizens of all backgrounds step up, take responsibility, and work together.

There are multiple Public Allies sites nationwide, many of which are operated in partnership with a local nonprofit organization or university. More than 80% of Allies come from the communities in which they serve.

Public Allies has employed three main strategies to deliver its mission: 1) Paid apprenticeship and leadership program in partnership with AmeriCorps, 2) Alumni engagement, and 3) Advocacy.

=== Apprenticeship ===
Public Allies combines a 10-month nonprofit apprenticeship program with a community-centered, values-based approach to foster leadership development. For four days each week, Allies serve at a community-based nonprofit, and the fifth day is devoted to rigorous leadership training. All members also engage in a number of community service projects.

=== Alumni engagement ===
Public Allies continues to develop the leadership practice (i.e., their skills, career and network) and impact of the Alumni of its AmeriCorps Apprenticeship Program (#PAAlum) and those who've worked at Public Allies (#StaffAlum). As of October 2022, there are nearly 9,000 that comprise this network.

More than 85% of program graduates continue their careers in nonprofit and public service. In 2014, Public Allies organized its first Alumni Summit on Black Male Achievement in Washington, D.C. Summit attendees included 30 African American male program graduates, who advised White House officials on the Administration's "My Brother's Keeper" initiative.

=== Advocacy ===
Public Allies has been a leader in efforts to build the next generation of diverse talent and leadership for the non-profit sector. It has influenced the national service field to become more inclusive and has been seen as a pathway to opportunity. Working with Voices for National Service, the White House Council for Community Solutions, The Aspen Institute, and the Service Pathways Initiative, Public Allies played a major role in influencing AmeriCorps, the Corporation for National and Community Service, and the broader national service field to increase the diversity of the people engaging in national service.

== Core values ==
Public Allies’ six core values are integrated into the program:

- Collaboration: The ability to facilitate, negotiate, build consensus, build strong teams, and empower others.
- Continuous Learning: The ability to question assumptions and beliefs, understand strengths and shortcomings, and commit to continued growth within a community context.
- Diversity and Inclusion: The ability to work effectively and inclusively with different people and understand how to adapt to different cultures and environments.
- Focus on Assets: The ability to catalyze the natural leadership of everyone, be truly accountable to those served, and approach opportunities for change with awareness of community assets.
- Integrity: The ability to meet commitments, act responsibly with public and personal trust, and be accountable for words and actions.
- Innovation: The ability to respond to demographic, political and social shifts by acting in creative ways that generate new solutions.

== Geographical reach and operating partners ==
Public Allies partners with nonprofit organizations and universities to operate multiple Public Allies sites nationwide.

Site	Operating Partner	Year founded
Public Allies Arizona	Arizona State University Lodestar Center for Philanthropy and Nonprofit Innovation	2006
Public Allies Central Florida	RISE Community Solutions	2010
Public Allies Chicago	Corporate office	1993
Public Allies Cincinnati*	Corporate office	1998
Public Allies Connecticut	Corporate office	2004
Public Allies Delaware	University of Delaware Center for Community Research & Service	1994
Public Allies Eagle Rock*	Eagle Rock School & Professional Development Center	2002
Public Allies Indianapolis	Indianapolis Neighborhood Resource Center	2009
Public Allies Los Angeles	Community Development Technologies Center (CDTech)	1999
Public Allies Detroit*		2010
Public Allies Miami*		2007
Public Allies New Mexico	University of New Mexico Community Engagement Center	2007
Public Allies New Orleans*		2017
Public Allies New York City*		1999
Public Allies North Carolina*		1994
Public Allies Pittsburgh	Corporate office	2006
Public Allies San Antonio	Alamo Colleges	2007
Public Allies San Francisco/Silicon Valley*		1995
Public Allies Twin Cities*		2010
Public Allies Washington, D.C.*		1992
Public Allies Wisconsin	Corporate Office	1994

== Alumni ==
- Michelle Obama (Founding Executive Director, Public Allies Chicago 1993), former First Lady of the United States
- Vanessa Kirsch (Co-founder and President & CEO 1992–1996), Founder and CEO, New Profit Inc.
- Sasheer Zamata (New York 2010), cast member, Saturday Night Live
- Omar Brownson (Silicon Valley 1997), the Executive Director at Los Angeles River Revitalization Commission
- Jason Holton, (Milwaukee and National Office), Executive Director & Vice President at City Year Milwaukee
- Joe Matassino (Delaware 2000), Director of Development at Delaware Center for Horticulture
- Kelly Zen-Yie Tsai (Chicago 2000), Spoken Word Poet / Filmmaker / Interdisciplinary Artist
- Matt Darby (Central Florida, 2014), former NFL player with the Buffalo Bills
- Abel Nunez (Washington DC 1997) is the Executive Director at Central America Resource Center – DC
- Travis Rejman (Chicago 1995), Executive Director at The Goldin Institute
- Jose Rico (Chicago 1994), Executive Director at White House Initiative on Educational Excellence for Hispanics
- Charles McKinney (North Carolina 1996, Program Staff of Public Allies North Carolina 1997–1999), Professor of Africana Studies at Rhodes College of Memphis, Tennessee
- Malik Yusef (Chicago 1997), poet and Grammy Award-winning recording artist.
- David Crowley (Milwaukee 2004), 47th governor of Wisconsin

== See also ==
- AmeriCorps
- Teach For America
- City Year
