= Alan Khazei =

American entrepreneur and politician

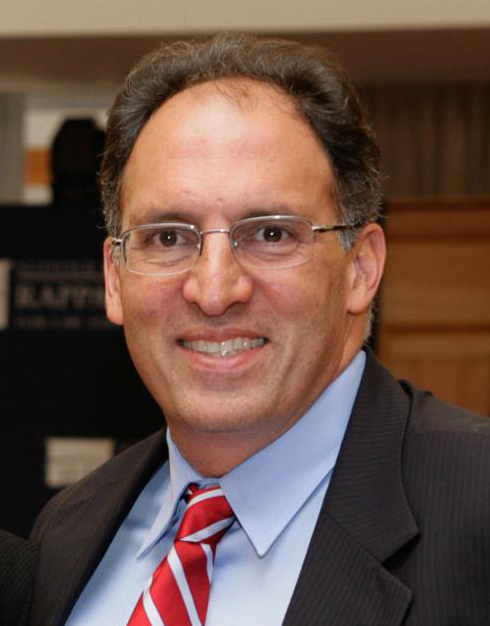

Personal details
- Born: May 28, 1961 (age 65) Pittsburgh, Pennsylvania, U.S.
- Party: Democratic
- Spouse: Vanessa Kirsch
- Children: 2
- Education: Harvard University (BA, JD)
- Website: Official website

Alan Khazei (KAY-zee; born May 28, 1961) is an American social entrepreneur. He was chief executive officer of City Year, an AmeriCorps national service program he co-founded with Michael Brown, his friend and roommate at Harvard College and Harvard Law School.

Khazei has led two unsuccessful campaigns for U.S. Senator from Massachusetts. He placed third in the Democratic primary in the 2010 special election, and withdrew from the primary in the 2012 election due to lack of funds and media attention after Elizabeth Warren got into the race. In September 2019, Khazei announced a run for U.S. Representative from Massachusetts's 4th congressional district. On September 1, 2020 Khazei placed sixth with 9.1% of the vote, and was defeated by Jake Auchincloss.

== Early life and education ==
Alan Khazei is the son of an Iranian-American surgeon and an Italian-American nurse. He was born in Pittsburgh and grew up in the Boston area and in Bedford, New Hampshire. In 1979, he graduated from St. Paul's School in Concord, New Hampshire, where he was president of his graduating class. He graduated from Harvard College with honors in 1983 and in 1987 from Harvard Law School with honors, where he was a member of the Harvard Legal Aid Bureau.

== Career ==
=== City Year ===
In 1988, Khazei and his then–Harvard roommate Michael Brown founded City Year, a non-profit organization that offers 17- to 24-year-olds the opportunity to engage in 10 months of full-time community service. Khazei and Brown envisioned that a year of national service could become a commonplace bridge between high school and college. Under his leadership, CityYear grew to employ 1,000 corps members in 29 cities across the United States as well as in Johannesburg, South Africa and the United Kingdom.

President George H. W. Bush appointed Khazei as vice-chair of the Commission on National and Community Service from 1990 to 1992. He later worked with President Bill Clinton to establish AmeriCorps. City Year, along with thousands of other non-profit organizations, is now a member of the AmeriCorps network.

In June 2003, when AmeriCorps funding was cut by 80%, Khazei and other service leaders organized "Save AmeriCorps", a grassroots campaign culminating in a 100-hour hearing in the Capitol. At this hearing, more than 700 AmeriCorps supporters testified. The campaign led to half of the AmeriCorps funding being restored in 2003 and to full restoration plus a $100 million increase in 2004. As a result of the increased funding, the AmeriCorps program was able to engage 25,000 more corps members.

=== ServiceNation ===
In 2008, Khazei organized ServiceNation, a summit event held in New York City on September 11, 2008 that featured then-presidential candidates Barack Obama and John McCain alongside over 700 other national service leaders. He then worked with Senator Ted Kennedy on the Edward M. Kennedy Serve America Act, which authorizes the greatest expansion of national service in America since President Franklin D. Roosevelt created the Civilian Conservation Corps. Khazei penned an article featured on The Huffington Post in April praising President Obama's signing of the new law, emphasizing the importance of "Big Citizenship over Big Government" and calling for a "New Patriotism" that looks to entrepreneurs and innovators in both the private and social sectors, forming new partnerships among government, the private sector, and the non-profit sector, all while taking advantage of modern technological advances that empower citizens and make government more effective and efficient. Previously, Khazei had written an article for The Huffington Post on national service "not as a Democratic idea or a Republican idea... but as an American idea" and another arguing for a renewed emphasis on ideas in political races to replace the current emphasis on fundraising alone.

From 2012 to 2015, he was the co-chair of the Leadership Council of the Franklin Project, a policy program of the Aspen Institute that sought to make a year of service a common opportunity and expectation for young Americans. Khazei worked with General Stanley McChrystal and others to merge ServiceNation with the Franklin Project to create the Service Year Alliance dedicated to making a year of service a rite of passage for all young Americans.

=== Other work ===
Khazei has been on the board of multiple organizations including City Year, Global Zero, the Harvard Alumni Association, the Mass Service Alliance, New Profit, Inc., Sparkshare, Serve Next, Share Our Strength, and Teach For America. He has also served on the advisory boards of the Ad Council, America's Promise, the Leadership Council of Boston Medical Center, the Center for Public Leadership at the John F. Kennedy School of Government, and the Partnership for Public Service. Khazei also serves as a commissioner on the National Commission on Military, National, and Public Service.

Additionally, he founded Democracy Entrepreneurs, which promotes new change agents who are inventing new ways to engage people in our democracy, and Be the Change, Inc., a Boston-based group dedicated to building national coalitions of non-profit organizations and citizens that promoted advancing issues of national service, fighting poverty and empowering veterans.

=== Awards and recognitions ===
In 2006, U.S. News & World Report named Khazei one of "America's 25 Best Leaders" and The Boston Globe Magazine named him as one of "11 Bostonians Changing the World". He is a recipient of the Reebok Human Rights Award, the Samuel S. Beard Jefferson Award for Public Service, the Caring Institute Award, the William Jefferson Clinton Award, the Jefferson Award for Public Service, and the Harvard Law School Association Outstanding Alumni Award. The NonProfit Times recognized Khazei as one of the 2008 "Executives of the Year" for his work in organizing ServiceNation.

He has received honorary degrees from Clark University, Hobart and William Smith Colleges, Northeastern University, Suffolk University, and Mount Ida College.

== U.S. Senate campaigns ==
=== 2010 election ===
Khazei ran to fill the United States Senate seat left vacant by the death of Senator Edward M. Kennedy. He sought the Democratic Party's nomination for this seat in the Democratic primary on December 8, 2009. He came in third, behind Congressman Mike Capuano and winner Massachusetts Attorney General Martha Coakley.

Khazei's campaign was the only campaign among the candidates for the Democratic primary that accepted donations only from private citizens. The campaign did not accept donations from political action committees and lobbyists. Khazei came in third place in the primary, earning 13% of the vote.

In November 2009, The Boston Globe endorsed Khazei for Senate, writing: "With high hopes, the Globe endorses Alan Khazei, the prime mover behind national-service policies, as Massachusetts' best chance to produce another great senator." Mayor Michael Bloomberg of New York City, former Colorado Senator Gary Hart, and retired 4-star General Wesley Clark also endorsed Khazei's Senate bid. While she never give an official endorsement of Khazei, Caroline Kennedy came out in support of Khazei's bid, attending some of his fundraisers and claiming he would make an "amazing" Senator.

=== 2012 election ===
On April 26, 2011, Khazei announced that he would be a candidate in the 2012 U.S. Senate election, looking to unseat Republican incumbent Scott Brown.

In response to the entry on September 15 of Harvard law professor Elizabeth Warren into the Senate campaign, Khazei issued a direct challenge to the other Democratic candidates—and specifically to Warren—to forego campaign funds from corporate lobbyists and all Political Action Committees. He pledged to do so himself. The Boston Globe's Noah Bierman reported that Khazei was leading the field of Democratic candidates in campaign funds as of the previous reporting period (June 30, 2011) with a reported total of $920,000, but that Senator Brown had a dramatic lead over all the Democrats, having amassed about $9.6 million in campaign funds as of June.

He signaled on October 26, 2011, that he planned to withdraw from the race, citing a lack of funds and media attention in the wake of Elizabeth Warren's entry into the race.

== U.S. House campaign ==
Khazei ran for Congress in 2020 to represent Massachusetts's 4th congressional district. Incumbent Joe Kennedy III vacated the seat to challenge Ed Markey for the U.S. Senate. Khazei lost the election, garnering 9.1% of the vote.

== Personal life ==
Khazei is married to Vanessa Kirsch, a social entrepreneur and graduate of Tufts University who has established several philanthropic organizations, most recently New Profit Inc., a group that provides grants to innovative social projects. They live in Brookline, Massachusetts, with their two children.

He is also the cousin of Boston TV news anchor, Kim Khazei.
