= 2010 United States Senate special election in Massachusetts =

- January 19, 2010
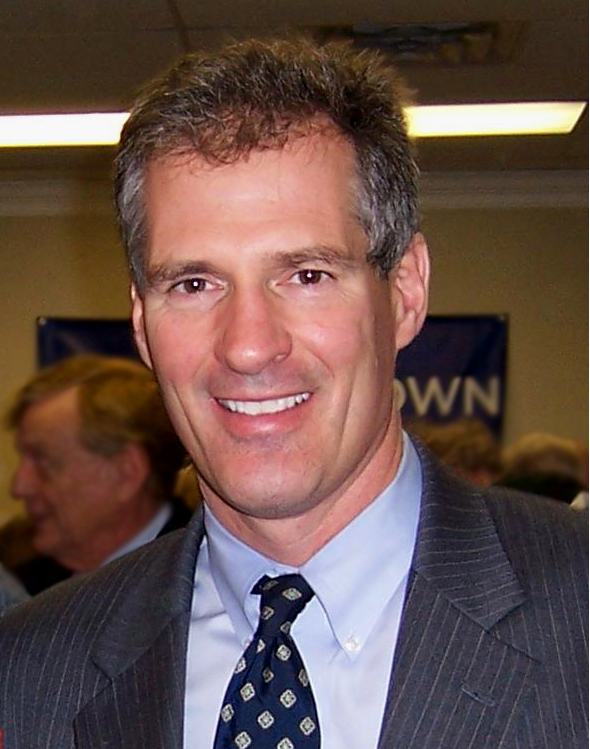

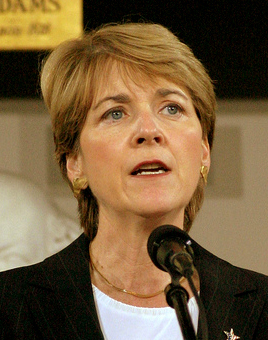
Nominee	Scott Brown	Martha Coakley
Party	Republican	Democratic
Popular vote	1,168,178	1,060,861
Percentage	51.86%	47.10%
- Brown: 40–50% 50–60% 60–70% 70–80% 80–90% Coakley: 40–50% 50–60% 60–70% 70–80% 80–90% >90% Tie: 40–50%
U.S. senator before election
Paul Kirk (Note: In September 2009, Kirk was appointed by Governor Deval Patrick to fill the vacancy caused by the death of Senator Ted Kennedy.)
Democratic
Elected U.S. Senator
Scott Brown
Republican

The 2010 United States Senate special election in Massachusetts was a special election held on January 19, 2010 to fill the Massachusetts Class I United States Senate seat for the remainder of the term ending January 3, 2013. The election was won by Republican candidate Scott Brown.

The vacancy that prompted the special election was created by the death of Democratic Senator Ted Kennedy on August 25, 2009. Kennedy had served as a U.S. senator since 1962, having been elected in a special election to fill the vacancy created when his brother John F. Kennedy was elected president of the United States in 1960. Following Ted Kennedy's death, Paul Kirk, a former chairman of the Democratic National Committee, was appointed to fill the vacated Senate seat.

The primary election was held on December 8, 2009. The Democratic Party nominated Massachusetts Attorney General Martha Coakley, while the Republican Party nominated State Senator Scott Brown. The race drew national attention because Brown unexpectedly caught up with Coakley in independent and internal polling during the last few days of the campaign. Coakley took several actions during the campaign that were widely believed to have cost her significant support. For example, less than a month before the election, she took six days off from campaigning; Brown called this break a "vacation". Also, when criticized for leaving the state for a Washington fundraiser instead of campaigning, Coakley responded by asking, "'As opposed to standing outside Fenway Park? In the cold? Shaking hands?'"

On January 19, 2010, Brown defeated Coakley, 51.83% to 47.07%, in a major upset. Brown's election broke the Democrats' filibuster-proof Senate majority.

== Background ==
=== Timeline ===
Massachusetts law requires a special election to be held on a Tuesday, no fewer than 145 days, nor more than 160 days from the date of office vacancy, on a date determined by the governor. That range placed the election date between January 17 and February 1, 2010. Massachusetts law specifies that a party primary shall be held the sixth Tuesday before the general election. On August 28, 2009, Secretary of the Commonwealth William F. Galvin presented the dates January 19 and 26, 2010, after meetings with State House Speaker Robert DeLeo, State Senate President Therese Murray, and aides to Governor Deval Patrick. Patrick was legally required to select one of these two dates. A January 19 election would require the primary to be held on December 8, while a January 26 election would have required a December 15 primary. Republican State Representative Karyn Polito suggested on August 28, 2009, that, because the possible election dates overlap the holiday season, the law ought to be rewritten to allow the special election to be held on November 3, 2009, to coincide with other elections in the state.

Patrick stated on August 29, 2009 that he wanted to honor a request by Kennedy that any appointee to the seat not run, and that he would address the issue of the election date "after we have finished this period of respectful grief." On August 31, 2009, Patrick scheduled the special election for January 19, 2010, with the primary elections on December 8, 2009. For party primary candidates, completed nomination papers with certified signatures were required to be filed by the close of business, November 3, 2009. Non-party candidates had a December 8, 2009, filing deadline.

=== Appointment ===
Seven days before his death, Senator Ted Kennedy communicated his desire to amend state law so that upon a U.S. Senate vacancy, the governor could appoint a senator to serve until the ensuing special election. Kennedy also asked that Governor Deval Patrick obtain the personal pledge of whoever he appointed to replace Kennedy that said appointee would not become a candidate in the ensuing special election.

A bill filed by State Rep. Robert Koczera of New Bedford in January 2009 proposed to permit the governor to appoint a senator; to enjoin the governor from appointing a candidate in a subsequent special election; and to permit the appointment date to occur only after the filing deadline for the special election had passed. Governor Patrick said he would push the General Court to pass the bill, and that he would sign it into law. The General Court held its first hearing on the legislation on September 9.

On September 17, 2009, the Massachusetts House of Representatives voted 95-58 to give the governor the power to appoint an interim senator. The Massachusetts Senate approved the measure on September 22, 2009, by a vote of 24 to 16, and both houses of the General Court gave final approval to the bill on September 23.

On September 24, 2009, Patrick appointed Paul G. Kirk, former Democratic National Committee chairman and aide to Ted Kennedy, to serve until the elected successor took office. Kennedy's two sons, Patrick J. Kennedy and Edward Kennedy, Jr., and his wife, Victoria Reggie Kennedy, had all expressed their preference for Kirk. Kirk was sworn into office on Friday, September 25, 2009. He pledged not to be a candidate in the special election.

== Democratic primary ==
The primary election was held on December 8, 2009.

=== Candidates ===
- Mike Capuano, U.S. Representative from Somerville (announced September 18, 2009)
- Martha Coakley, Massachusetts Attorney General (announced September 3, 2009)
- Alan Khazei, co-founder and former CEO of City Year (announced September 24, 2009)
- Stephen Pagliuca, managing director of Bain Capital and managing partner of the Boston Celtics (announced September 17, 2009)

=== Polling ===
Source	Date(s) administered	Mike Capuano	Martha Coakley	Alan Khazei	Stephen Pagliuca	Other
Rasmussen Reports (report) (Note: Sample size: 611, margin of error: ±4%)	September 8, 2009	7%	38%	—	—	24%
Suffolk University (report) (Note: Sample size: 500, margin of error: ±4.4%)	September 16, 2009	9%	47%	3%	—	6%
Lake Research (report) (Note: Sample size: 800, margin of error: ±3.5%)	September 21–24, 2009	12%	47%	1%	4%	—
Research 2000 (report) (Note: Sample size: 400, margin of error: ±5%)	October 28–29, 2009	16%	42%	5%	15%	—
Suffolk University (report) (Note: Sample size: 600, margin of error: ±4%)	November 4–8, 2009	16%	44%	3%	17%	—
The Boston Globe (report)(graphic) (Note: Sample size: 537, margin of error: ±4.4%)	November 13–18, 2009	22%	43%	6%	15%	—
Rasmussen Reports (report) (Note: Sample size: 567, margin of error: ±4%)	November 23, 2009	21%	36%	14%	14%	5%

=== Results ===
Results by Municipality: Coakley: 30–40%; 40–50%; 50–60%; 60–70%; 70–80%; 80–90%; 90–100%; Capuano: 30–40%; 40–50%; 50–60%; 60–70%; Khazei: 50–60% Tie

Results by precinct: Coakley: 30–40%; 40–50%; 50–60%; 60–70%; 70–80%; 80–90%; 90–100%; Capuano: 30–40%; 40–50%; 50–60%; 60–70%; 70–80%; 80–90%; 90–100%; Khazei: 30–40%; 40–50%; 50–60%; Tie No data/No votes

Democratic primary results
Party	Candidate	Votes	%
Democratic	Martha Coakley	310,227	46.71%
Democratic	Mike Capuano	184,791	27.82%
Democratic	Alan Khazei	88,929	13.39%
Democratic	Stephen Pagliuca	80,248	12.08%
Total votes		664,195	100.00%

== Republican primary ==
=== Candidates ===
- Scott Brown, State Senator from Wrentham
- Jack E. Robinson III, perennial candidate

=== Campaign ===
Brown announced his candidacy on September 12, 2009. He previously announced, on September 6, 2009, that he was exploring becoming a candidate under the "testing the waters" provisions of federal election law, and intended to announce his decision on whether he would become a candidate on September 9 or 10, 2009. On September 9, Brown said that he would not run if George W. Bush's White House Chief of Staff Andrew Card entered the race. On September 11, Card declined to run and offered his support to Brown.

=== Polling ===
Source	Dates administered	Scott Brown	Jack E. Robinson III	Undecided
Suffolk University (report)	November 4–8, 2009	45%	7%	47%

=== Results ===
Republican primary results
Party	Candidate	Votes	%
Republican	Scott Brown	145,465	89.40%
Republican	Jack Robinson	17,241	10.60%
Total votes		162,706	100.00%

== Other candidates ==
Independent or third party candidates had until December 8, 2009 to submit nomination papers for signature certification.

Joseph L. Kennedy, a member of the Libertarian Party, ran as an independent. He has no relation to the politically prominent Kennedy family.

== General election ==
Initially, Coakley was heavily favored to prevail in the general election.

Brown considered himself a fiscal conservative and Washington, D.C. outsider. He said "I have always thought that being in government service is a privilege, not a right. This Senate seat doesn't belong to any one person or political party. It belongs to you, the people, and the people deserve a U.S. senator who will always put your interests first." Brown had called for fiscal restraint and smaller government, claiming that he had never voted for a tax increase. Brown also pledged to be the 41st vote against President Barack Obama's health care reform bill in the Senate. Assistant Professor Boris Schor of the University of Chicago's Harris School of Public Policy Studies described Brown as a liberal Republican by national standards, but well suited for his Massachusetts constituency. Brown drew attention for having appeared nude and semi-nude with his hands covering his genitals in a centerfold in Cosmopolitan in 1982.

During a State Senate debate in 2001, Brown had referred to the decision of his lesbian Democratic opponent, Cheryl Jacques, to have children as "not normal". He also described her parenting role as "alleged family responsibilities." Several Massachusetts LGBT activists condemned the statement. Brown apologized for his "poor choice of words", and he defended his position on that issue as being anti-gay-marriage and pro-civil-unions.

Brown filed an ethics complaint stating that the Service Employees International Union (SEIU) Local 509 used state computers and e-mail addresses to direct employees of the state to volunteer for Coakley's campaign.

Controversy erupted over a conscientious objector amendment Brown sponsored in 2005, which, according to The Boston Globe, "would have allowed a doctor, nurse or hospital to deny rape victims an emergency contraceptive if it 'conflicts with a sincerely held religious belief.'" In the candidates' January 5 debate, Brown stated that he continues to support religious hospitals in refusing to provide emergency contraception, causing the woman to go to another hospital. He said, "That's really up to the hospital. There are many, many hospitals that can deal with that situation." Coakley ran a television advertisement attacking Brown over that saying, "Brown even favors letting hospitals deny emergency contraception to rape victims." Brown's daughter Ayla called the Coakley advertisement "completely inaccurate and misleading", and Brown criticized Coakley for running what he described as "attack ads".

Coakley took several actions during the campaign that were widely believed to have cost her significant support. For example, less than a month before the election, she took six days off from campaigning; Brown called this break a "vacation". The Boston Herald commented, "Laying low in the final weeks of a truncated election is unusual – and a luxury that only a very confident candidate could afford." Also, when criticized for leaving the state for a Washington fundraiser instead of campaigning, Coakley responded by asking, "'As opposed to standing outside Fenway Park? In the cold? Shaking hands?'"

Two of Coakley's advertisements had to be re-edited after they first aired. One advertisement misspelled the word "Massachusetts' (spelling it Massachusettes), while another used old stock footage of New York's World Trade Center--which was destroyed in the September 11 terrorist attacks--to represent Wall Street. The second ad was meant to depict Brown as a Wall Street crony.

In a radio interview on January 16, 2010, Coakley described former Boston Red Sox pitcher Curt Schilling as a "Yankee fan," which drew criticism. Schilling, who considered running for the Senate seat himself and later endorsed Scott Brown, responded by saying "I've been called a lot of things ... but never, I mean never, could anyone make the mistake of calling me a Yankee fan. Well, check that, if you didn't know what the hell is going on in your own state maybe you could ..." Coakley later described the comment as a joke.

Coakley's role in the case of Keith Winfield attracted criticism. In October 2005, Winfield, then working as a police officer, was accused of raping his 23-month-old niece with a hot object (most likely a curling iron). A Middlesex County grand jury overseen by Coakley investigated the case and did not take any action. After the toddler's mother filed applications for criminal complaints, Coakley obtained grand jury indictments charging Winfield with rape, assault, and battery. About ten months after the indictment, she recommended that Winfield be released without bail. Winfield remained free until December 2007. Coakley defended her decisions, saying that Winfield had a clean record and that there were few other signs of danger.

Brown accused Coakley of behaving like she was entitled to the Senate seat merely by dint of being the candidate of the Democratic Party; famously, he said during one of the candidates debates that the U.S. Senate seat was "not Kennedy's seat, and it's not the Democrats' seat; it's the people's seat".

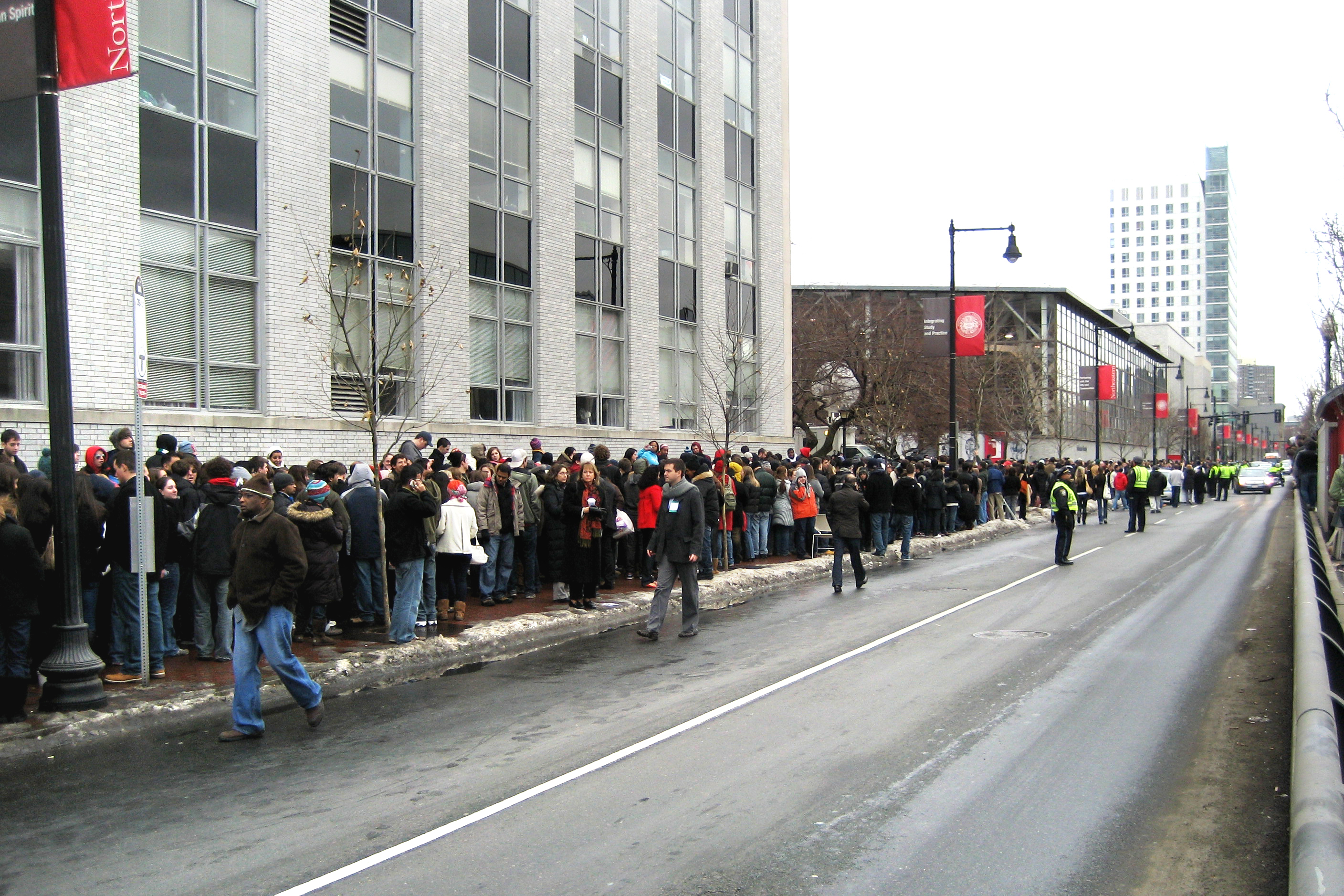

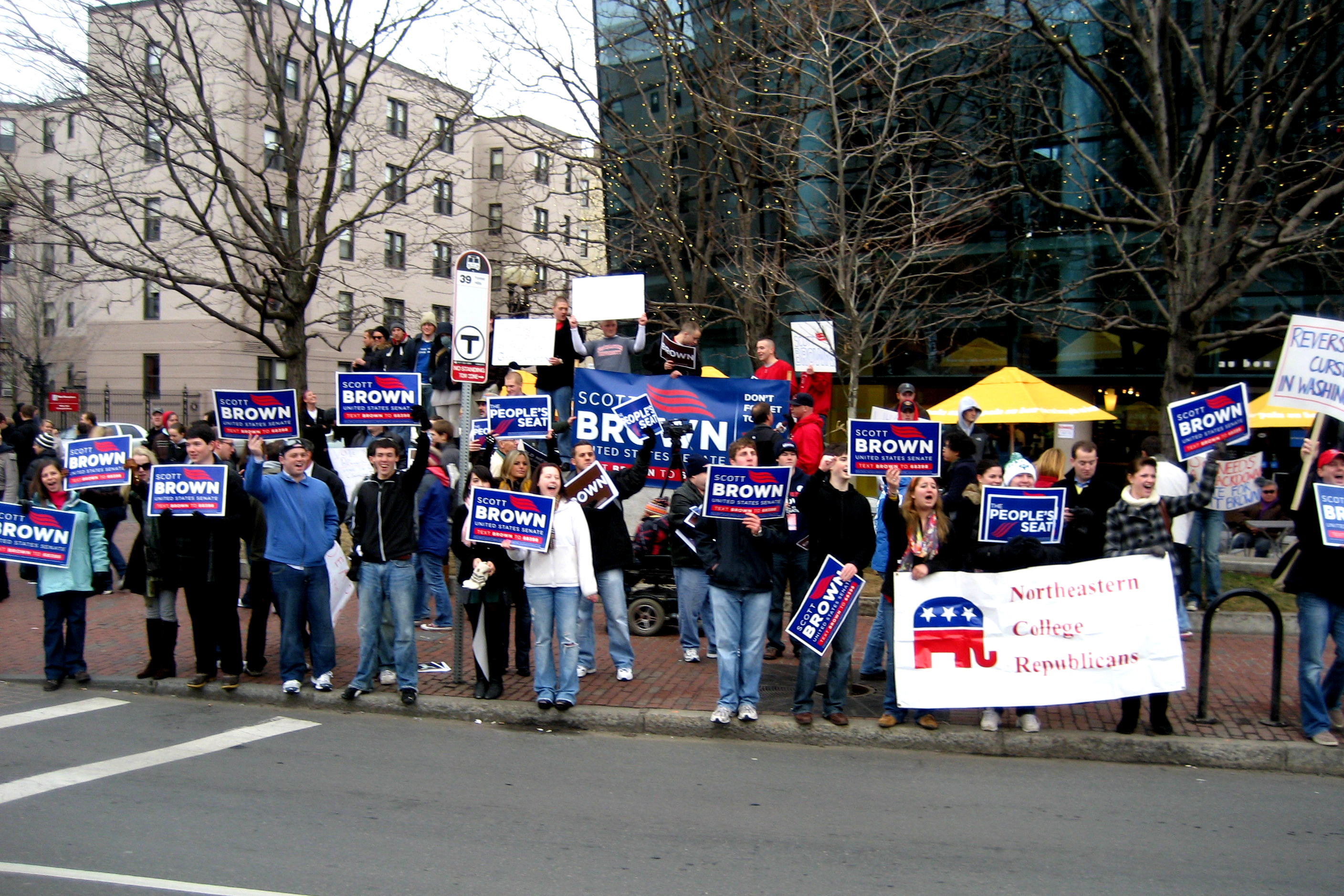
People stand in line to see Barack Obama campaign for Martha Coakley at Northeastern University (top). Scott Brown supporters line the opposite side of the street (bottom).

CQ Politics and Cook Political Report rated the election as a "Tossup". The Rothenberg Political Report changed its rating from "Tossup" to "Lean Takeover" on January 18. Charlie Cook of the Cook Political Report stated on January 17, said that he would put his "finger on the scale" for Scott Brown as favored to win. The Rothenberg Political Report released a statement that, "unless Democratic turnout exceeds everyone's expectations, Brown is headed for a comfortable win." As of January 18, Brown led Coakley in the Intrade prediction market by high double-digit margins. Statistician Nate Silver of FiveThirtyEight.com projected on January 18 that there was a 75% chance that Brown would defeat Coakley.

=== Finances ===
As of January 8, 2010, Martha Coakley raised over US$5.2million in total, and had $937,383 cash on hand. Scott Brown had $367,150 cash on hand. Brown spent $450,000 on television advertisements, while Coakley spent $1.4million. A week before the general election, Brown raised $1.3 million from over 16,000 donors in a 24-hour fund-raising effort. Reports also indicated that Brown raised an average of $1 million per day the week prior to the election. This outpouring of support from the Internet and other givers offset what had been relatively less support from national Republican committees, who had decided not to target the race publicly. In the final fundraising push one of Brown's contributions for $5,000 came from David Koch, a wealthy activist and supporter of conservative causes and campaigns. Koch had also given the National Republican Senatorial Committee $30,400 in November 2009 and the Koch Industries PAC gave $15,000 to NRSC right before the January 2010 special election.

Coakley admitted to making an "honest mistake" while filing the financial disclosure forms for her Senate run claiming to have no personal assets when in fact she had an account under her husband's name with over $200,000 and a personal Individual Retirement Account containing approximately $12,000.

Approximately US$23 million was spent on the election.

Campaign finance reports as of February 8, 2010
Candidate	Raised	Spent	Cash on hand
Scott Brown (R)	$15,228,414	$7,581,832	$6,034,498
Martha Coakley (D)	$9,594,298	$7,710,624	$456,220
Source: Federal Election Commission

=== Debates ===
All three candidates participated in the debates. The first was held on the Jim & Margery show in Boston on January 5, and broadcast by WTKK. The January 8 debate was held in Springfield, Massachusetts and originating at WGBY-TV's studios, aired by them and its sister WGBH-TV-FM stations in Boston. The final debate was held on January 11 at the Edward M. Kennedy Institute at the University of Massachusetts Boston and carried live on TV and radio on multiple stations throughout the state, and both television debates aired nationwide live on C-SPAN.

=== Endorsements ===
Scott Brown

U.S. senators

- John McCain, U.S. Senator from Arizona and Republican nominee for president in 2008

State executive branch officials

- Mitt Romney, former governor of Massachusetts and candidate for president in 2008
- Bill Weld, former governor of Massachusetts and nominee for U.S. Senate in 1996

Local officials

- Rudy Giuliani, former mayor of New York City and candidate for president in 2008

Newspapers

- Boston Herald
- Cape Cod Times
- The Eagle-Tribune
- Telegram & Gazette
- The Sun
- The Martha's Vineyard Times
- The Salem News

Individuals

- Doug Flutie, former Boston College Eagles and New England Patriots quarterback
- Curt Schilling, former Boston Red Sox pitcher

Organizations

- Tea Party Express
Martha Coakley

Federal executive branch officials

- Bill Clinton, 42nd President of the United States
- Barack Obama, 44th President of the United States

Newspapers

- The Boston Globe
- The Boston Phoenix
- Watertown Tab & Press

Individuals

- Vicki Kennedy, widow of Ted Kennedy

=== Media ===
In regards to the coverage of the election, MSNBC was criticized by one reporter for perceived bias against Brown, while Fox News was accused of favoring Brown. One journalist reported that CNN and Fox News may have delivered more balanced coverage on the election day itself, providing both Republican and Democratic commentators.

On Fox's Hannity on January 11, political commentator Dick Morris solicited donations for a last-minute Brown advertising buy before the election, and said "please, please help (elect Brown)". Brown himself made multiple appearances on various Fox programs within a 24-hour-period, where he made fundraising solicitations during the course of the interviews.

=== Predictions ===
Source	Ranking	As of
Cook Political Report	Tossup	January 18, 2010
Rothenberg	Lean R (flip)	January 18, 2010
RealClearPolitics	Tossup	January 18, 2010
Sabato's Crystal Ball	Tossup	January 18, 2010
CQ Politics	Tossup	January 18, 2010

=== Polling ===
Poll source	Date(s) administered	Sample size	Margin of error	Scott Brown (R)	Martha Coakley (D)	Joseph L. Kennedy (I)	Other	Undecided
Suffolk University (report)	September 16, 2009	500	± 4.4%	24%	54%		20%	9%
Western New England College (report)	October 18–22, 2009	468	± 4.5%	32%	58%		9%	9%
Suffolk University (report)	November 4–8, 2009	600	± 4%	27%	58%		15%	9%
The Boston Globe (report)	January 2–6, 2010	554	± 4.2%	35%	50%	5%		9%
Rasmussen Reports (report)	January 4, 2010	500	± 4.5%	41%	50%		1%	7%
Public Policy Polling (report)	January 7–9, 2010	744	± 3.6%	48%	47%			6%
Rasmussen Reports (report)	January 11, 2010	1000	± 3%	47%	49%	3%		2%
Suffolk University (report)	January 11–13, 2010	500	± 4.4%	50%	46%	3%		1%
Research 2000 (report)	January 12–13, 2010	500	± 4%	41%	49%	5%		5%
American Research Group (report)	January 12–14, 2010	600	± 4%	48%	45%	2%		5%
CrossTarget Research	January 14, 2010	946	± 3.19%	54%	39%			8%
Merriman River Group (report)	January 15, 2010	565	± 4%	51%	41%	2%		6%
American Research Group (report)	January 15–17, 2010	600	± 4%	52%	45%	2%		2%
Daily Kos/Research 2000 (report)	January 15–17, 2010	500	± 4.5%	48%	48%	3%		1%
CrossTarget Research	January 16–17, 2010	571	± 4.09%	52%	42%			6%
Public Policy Polling (report)	January 16–17, 2010	1231	± 2.8%	51%	46%			4%
Politico (report)	January 17, 2010	804	± 3.4%	52%	43%	2%		3%

=== Results ===
Polls closed at 8:00pm Eastern Time. At 9:06pm BNO News projected Brown as the winner of the race. At 9:13 p.m., The Boston Globe reported that Coakley had telephoned Brown and conceded the election.

2010 Massachusetts U.S. Senate special election
Party	Candidate	Votes	%	±%
Republican	Scott Brown	1,168,178	51.86%	▲21.31
Democratic	Martha Coakley	1,060,861	47.10%	▼22.20
Libertarian	Joseph L. Kennedy	22,388	0.99%	N/A
	All others	1,155	0.05%	▼0.10
Total votes		2,252,582	100.00%	N/A
Republican gain from Democratic				

==== By county ====
By county

2010 United States Senate special election in Massachusetts (by county)
County	Brown - R %	Brown - R #	Coakley - D %	Coakley - D #	Others %	Others #	Total #
Barnstable	57.38%	60,032	41.72%	43,652	0.89%	938	104,622
Berkshire	30.49%	13,298	68.48%	29,869	1.03%	447	43,614
Bristol	55.77%	93,826	43.03%	72,392	1.20%	2,028	168,246
Dukes	34.52%	2,646	64.21%	4,922	1.28%	98	7,666
Essex	56.49%	143,969	42.55%	108,430	0.96%	2,436	254,835
Franklin	35.71%	9,908	62.64%	17,382	1.65%	457	27,747
Hampden	54.48%	71,697	43.99%	57,890	1.53%	2,017	131,604
Hampshire	37.27%	21,112	61.44%	34,808	1.30%	733	56,653
Middlesex	47.38%	256,927	51.70%	283,595	0.92%	5,054	548,576
Nantucket	47.98%	2,032	50.55%	2,141	1.46%	62	4,235
Norfolk	55.17%	150,890	43.95%	120,198	0.88%	2,411	273,499
Plymouth	62.92%	120,971	36.21%	69,615	0.88%	1,690	192,276
Suffolk	32.74%	57,461	66.12%	116,038	1.13%	1,988	175,487
Worcester	60.87%	160,409	37.92%	99,929	1.20%	3,184	263,522
Totals	51.86%	1,168,178	47.10%	1,060,861	1.04%	23,543	

Counties that flipped from Democratic to Republican

- Barnstable (largest municipality: Barnstable)
- Bristol (largest municipality: New Bedford)
- Essex (largest municipality: Lynn)
- Hampden (largest municipality: Springfield)
- Norfolk (largest municipality: Quincy)
- Plymouth (largest municipality: Brockton)
- Worcester (largest municipality: Worcester)

==== By municipality ====
The Associated Press and The Boston Globe reported voting results for each of the 351 municipalities in Massachusetts. Brown won in 229 of those 351 municipalities, while Coakley won in 121. Coakley and Brown tied in the small town of Hawley, each receiving 63 votes. In general, Brown drew support from suburban towns in the central and southeastern portions of the state, while Coakley generally fared well in the cities, in rural towns in western Massachusetts, and on the offshore islands. More specifically, support for Brown tended to be high in Hampden County, the 495 Corridor, the South Shore suburbs and the southwestern part of Cape Cod, particularly the Upper Cape. Brown also won or ran close to even in a number of historically Democratic working-class cities such as Worcester, Lowell and Quincy. Coakley generally fared well in the Berkshires and the cities, and had particularly strong support in college towns such as Amherst, Northampton and Cambridge.

Rank
of 351
1
2
3
4
5
6
7
8
9
10
11
12
13
14
15
16
17
18
19
20
21
22
23
24
25
26
27
28
29
30
31
32
33
34
35
36
37
38
39
40
41
42
43
44
45
46
47
48
49
50
51
52
53
54
55
56
57
58
59
60
61
62
63
64
65
66
67
68
69
70
71
72
73
74
75
76
77
78
79
80
81
82
83
84
85
86
87
88
89
90
91
92
93
94
95
96
97
98
99
100
101
102
103
104
105
106
107
108
109
110
111
112
113
114
115
116
117
118
119
120
121
122
123
124
125
126
127
128
129
130
131
132
133
134
135
136
137
138
139
140
141
142
143
144
145
146
147
148
149
150
151
152
153
154
155
156
157
158
159
160
161
162
163
164
165
166
167
168
169
170
171
172
173
174
175
176
177
178
179
180
181
182
183
184
185
186
187
188
189
190
191
192
193
194
195
196
197
198
199
200
201
202
203
204
205
206
207
208
209
210
211
212
213
214
215
216
217
218
219
220
221
222
223
224
225
226
227
228
229
230
231
232
233
234
235
236
237
238
239
240
241
242
243
244
245
246
247
248
249
250
251
252
253
254
255
256
257
258
259
260
261
262
263
264
265
266
267
268
269
270
271
272
273
274
275
276
277
278
279
280
281
282
283
284
285
286
287
288
289
290
291
292
293
294
295
296
297
298
299
300
301
302
303
304
305
306
307
308
309
310
311
312
313
314
315
316
317
318
319
320
321
322
323
324
325
326
327
328
329
330
331
332
333
334
335
336
337
338
339
340
341
342
343
344
345
346
347
348
349
350
351
—

Municipality	Coakley votes	Coakley %	Brown votes	Brown %	Kennedy votes	Kennedy %	Total vote	Turnout %
Abington	2,088	33.1%	4,158	65.9%	61	1.0%	6,307	60%
Acton	5,371	57.5%	3,896	41.7%	71	0.8%	9,338	68%
Acushnet	1,627	42.8%	2,138	56.3%	34	0.9%	3,799	51%
Adams	1,650	68.1%	748	30.9%	26	1.1%	2,424	40%
Agawam	3,660	34.7%	6,726	63.8%	158	1.5%	10,544	51%
Alford	157	69.2%	68	30.0%	2	0.9%	227	58%
Amesbury	2,543	41.7%	3,480	57.1%	70	1.1%	6,093	51%
Amherst	6,547	84.0%	1,180	15.1%	64	0.8%	7,791	47%
Andover	5,900	41.2%	8,336	58.2%	80	0.6%	14,316	64%
Aquinnah	149	77.6%	42	21.9%	1	0.5%	192	48%
Arlington	13,284	65.5%	6,845	33.7%	157	0.8%	20,286	68%
Ashburnham	866	35.1%	1,574	63.8%	27	1.1%	2,467	58%
Ashby	475	33.0%	949	66.0%	14	1.0%	1,438	60%
Ashfield	670	75.0%	212	23.7%	11	1.2%	893	69%
Ashland	2,897	45.1%	3,467	54.0%	60	0.9%	6,424	61%
Athol	1,171	35.0%	2,105	62.9%	68	2.0%	3,344	50%
Attleboro	4,819	35.6%	8,598	63.5%	116	0.9%	13,533	53%
Auburn	2,406	36.9%	4,036	62.0%	72	1.1%	6,514	56%
Avon	706	37.5%	1,155	61.3%	22	1.2%	1,883	62%
Ayer	989	39.6%	1,467	58.8%	41	1.6%	2,497	53%
Barnstable	7,543	37.6%	12,331	61.5%	179	0.9%	20,053	65%
Barre	728	36.1%	1,263	62.7%	23	1.1%	2,014	58%
Becket	384	62.0%	225	36.3%	10	1.6%	619	49%
Bedford	2,976	50.3%	2,900	49.0%	46	0.8%	5,922	64%
Belchertown	2,629	48.4%	2,749	50.6%	57	1.0%	5,435	57%
Bellingham	2,179	34.3%	4,090	64.4%	78	1.2%	6,347	61%
Belmont	6,528	59.3%	4,405	40.0%	76	0.7%	11,009	67%
Berkley	746	31.2%	1,614	67.6%	28	1.2%	2,388	56%
Berlin	538	39.0%	825	59.7%	18	1.3%	1,381	69%
Bernardston	445	52.9%	378	44.9%	19	2.3%	842	54%
Beverly	6,735	44.0%	8,400	54.9%	163	1.1%	15,298	61%
Billerica	4,972	33.8%	9,583	65.1%	156	1.1%	14,711	60%
Blackstone	1,052	32.9%	2,102	65.8%	40	1.3%	3,194	53%
Blandford	196	35.6%	343	62.4%	11	2.0%	550	63%
Bolton	995	41.9%	1,362	57.3%	18	0.8%	2,375	74%
Boston	105,289	68.7%	46,468	30.3%	1,513	1.0%	153,270	43%
Bourne	2,807	35.0%	5,134	64.0%	76	0.9%	8,017	61%
Boxborough	1,141	50.7%	1,087	48.3%	21	0.9%	2,249	67%
Boxford	1,239	30.3%	2,837	69.3%	18	0.4%	4,094	69%
Boylston	729	35.2%	1,321	63.7%	23	1.1%	2,073	67%
Braintree	5,606	37.2%	9,312	61.8%	155	1.0%	15,073	61%
Brewster	2,416	46.5%	2,730	52.6%	46	0.9%	5,192	64%
Bridgewater	2,794	31.0%	6,138	68.1%	85	0.9%	9,017	58%
Brimfield	489	32.8%	995	66.7%	7	0.5%	1,491	58%
Brockton	11,761	54.4%	9,634	44.6%	223	1.0%	21,618	41%
Brookfield	430	33.8%	813	63.9%	29	2.3%	1,272	55%
Brookline	15,264	74.1%	5,217	25.3%	108	0.5%	20,589	49%
Buckland	522	65.4%	263	33.0%	13	1.6%	798	62%
Burlington	3,658	39.1%	5,640	60.3%	54	0.6%	9,352	58%
Cambridge	27,268	84.1%	4,921	15.2%	232	0.7%	32,421	54%
Canton	3,787	39.3%	5,770	59.9%	80	0.8%	9,637	63%
Carlisle	1,442	54.0%	1,215	45.5%	13	0.5%	2,670	73%
Carver	1,611	33.0%	3,222	66.0%	50	1.0%	4,883	56%
Charlemont	278	60.0%	176	38.0%	9	1.9%	463	52%
Charlton	1,271	26.6%	3,458	72.4%	46	1.0%	4,775	53%
Chatham	1,488	40.3%	2,179	59.0%	27	0.7%	3,694	65%
Chelmsford	5,688	37.3%	9,417	61.8%	128	0.8%	15,233	65%
Chelsea	2,562	61.9%	1,501	36.3%	73	1.8%	4,136	37%
Cheshire	740	62.2%	436	36.7%	13	1.1%	1,189	51%
Chester	194	39.0%	292	58.6%	12	2.4%	498	54%
Chesterfield	264	51.8%	242	47.5%	4	0.8%	510	59%
Chicopee	7,043	44.8%	8,339	53.1%	334	2.1%	15,716	46%
Chilmark	364	70.7%	141	27.4%	10	1.9%	515	59%
Clarksburg	395	67.3%	186	31.7%	6	1.0%	587	52%
Clinton	1,661	37.4%	2,724	61.3%	59	1.3%	4,444	47%
Cohasset	1,419	37.0%	2,401	62.6%	17	0.4%	3,837	70%
Colrain	401	60.2%	249	37.4%	16	2.4%	666	56%
Concord	5,445	62.1%	3,271	37.3%	52	0.6%	8,768	72%
Conway	685	69.0%	303	30.5%	5	0.5%	993	66%
Cummington	306	69.2%	130	29.4%	6	1.4%	442	68%
Dalton	1,423	61.7%	845	36.7%	37	1.6%	2,305	50%
Danvers	3,651	36.2%	6,347	62.9%	89	0.9%	10,087	57%
Dartmouth	5,110	46.4%	5,812	52.7%	98	0.9%	11,020	47%
Dedham	4,647	43.1%	5,979	55.5%	147	1.4%	10,773	65%
Deerfield	1,482	62.5%	853	36.0%	36	1.5%	2,371	63%
Dennis	3,131	41.4%	4,358	57.6%	76	1.0%	7,565	65%
Dighton	829	31.6%	1,770	67.5%	24	0.9%	2,623	57%
Douglas	840	25.4%	2,440	73.7%	31	0.9%	3,311	54%
Dover	1,058	35.8%	1,888	63.8%	13	0.4%	2,959	75%
Dracut	3,166	29.0%	7,658	70.2%	87	0.8%	10,911	55%
Dudley	1,125	30.6%	2,515	68.4%	39	1.1%	3,679	53%
Dunstable	502	33.8%	968	65.2%	14	0.9%	1,484	69%
Duxbury	2,674	34.7%	4,982	64.7%	44	0.6%	7,700	70%
East Bridgewater	1,583	28.9%	3,849	70.4%	39	0.7%	5,471	60%
East Brookfield	245	27.3%	645	71.7%	9	1.0%	899	60%
Eastham	1,540	50.7%	1,473	48.5%	25	0.8%	3,038	71%
Easthampton	3,708	58.9%	2,493	39.6%	91	1.4%	6,292	56%
East Longmeadow	2,091	32.5%	4,294	66.6%	58	0.9%	6,443	58%
Easton	3,350	35.9%	5,931	63.5%	59	0.6%	9,340	61%
Edgartown	1,002	55.8%	771	42.9%	24	1.3%	1,797	57%
Egremont	445	71.8%	172	27.7%	3	0.5%	620	65%
Erving	296	57.8%	208	40.6%	8	1.6%	512	47%
Essex	685	39.7%	1,023	59.3%	17	1.0%	1,725	63%
Everett	4,245	52.0%	3,798	46.5%	123	1.5%	8,166	44%
Fairhaven	2,834	47.6%	3,045	51.2%	69	1.2%	5,948	54%
Fall River	10,341	56.9%	7,489	41.2%	343	1.9%	18,173	38%
Falmouth	7,133	46.6%	8,041	52.5%	128	0.8%	15,302	59%
Fitchburg	3,783	40.0%	5,574	58.9%	104	1.1%	9,461	46%
Florida	144	52.9%	125	46.0%	3	1.1%	272	49%
Foxborough	2,465	33.6%	4,821	65.7%	57	0.8%	7,343	65%
Framingham	10,329	52.6%	9,149	46.6%	160	0.8%	19,638	58%
Franklin	4,470	33.3%	8,828	65.8%	110	0.8%	13,408	67%
Freetown	1,189	34.5%	2,220	64.5%	34	1.0%	3,443	55%
Gardner	2,441	42.0%	3,271	56.2%	105	1.8%	5,817	52%
Georgetown	1,239	34.7%	2,311	64.6%	25	0.7%	3,575	61%
Gill	398	62.2%	226	35.3%	16	2.5%	640	60%
Gloucester	5,553	49.6%	5,522	49.3%	121	1.1%	11,196	56%
Goshen	244	53.0%	204	44.3%	12	2.6%	460	64%
Gosnold	18	38.3%	29	61.7%	0	0.0%	47	34%
Grafton	2,442	35.5%	4,372	63.6%	59	0.9%	6,873	60%
Granby	1,044	40.4%	1,512	58.5%	27	1.0%	2,583	57%
Granville	207	30.2%	472	68.9%	6	0.9%	685	60%
Great Barrington	2,025	76.7%	591	22.4%	25	0.9%	2,641	57%
Greenfield	3,835	64.6%	1,992	33.6%	109	1.8%	5,936	53%
Groton	2,132	44.2%	2,663	55.2%	29	0.6%	4,824	67%
Groveland	991	33.0%	1,980	66.0%	28	0.9%	2,999	62%
Hadley	1,407	59.3%	936	39.5%	29	1.2%	2,372	63%
Halifax	992	31.2%	2,147	67.5%	42	1.3%	3,181	57%
Hamilton	1,381	37.1%	2,319	62.2%	27	0.7%	3,727	65%
Hampden	754	32.9%	1,511	65.9%	27	1.2%	2,292	65%
Hancock	158	57.0%	118	42.6%	1	0.4%	277	54%
Hanover	1,895	28.4%	4,731	71.0%	35	0.5%	6,661	71%
Hanson	1,254	28.8%	3,067	70.4%	35	0.8%	4,356	65%
Hardwick	377	38.6%	586	60.0%	14	1.4%	977	55%
Harvard	1,568	54.1%	1,305	45.1%	23	0.8%	2,896	71%
Harwich	2,635	41.9%	3,597	57.2%	51	0.8%	6,283	62%
Hatfield	875	56.2%	652	41.9%	29	1.9%	1,556	62%
Haverhill	7,259	39.2%	11,069	59.7%	202	1.1%	18,530	45%
Hawley	63	48.1%	63	48.1%	5	3.8%	131	58%
Heath	203	61.9%	123	37.5%	2	0.6%	328	62%
Hingham	4,416	39.2%	6,800	60.3%	53	0.5%	11,269	72%
Hinsdale	415	58.5%	285	40.1%	10	1.4%	710	50%
Holbrook	1,527	38.5%	2,402	60.5%	41	1.0%	3,970	57%
Holden	2,864	34.4%	5,396	64.7%	74	0.9%	8,334	68%
Holland	299	31.9%	631	67.3%	8	0.9%	938	51%
Holliston	2,921	43.7%	3,725	55.8%	35	0.5%	6,681	68%
Holyoke	4,869	55.3%	3,771	42.8%	169	1.9%	8,809	36%
Hopedale	997	37.7%	1,619	61.2%	30	1.1%	2,646	67%
Hopkinton	2,600	38.5%	4,123	61.0%	35	0.5%	6,758	71%
Hubbardston	607	30.0%	1,388	68.5%	30	1.5%	2,025	67%
Hudson	3,068	41.8%	4,181	57.0%	90	1.2%	7,339	58%
Hull	2,037	45.4%	2,409	53.7%	44	1.0%	4,490	58%
Huntington	346	41.2%	467	55.7%	26	3.1%	839	60%
Ipswich	2,604	41.6%	3,604	57.6%	45	0.7%	6,253	62%
Kingston	1,701	32.0%	3,576	67.4%	31	0.6%	5,308	63%
Lakeville	1,259	27.7%	3,248	71.4%	44	1.0%	4,551	62%
Lancaster	1,012	34.9%	1,860	64.2%	25	0.9%	2,897	63%
Lanesborough	654	61.5%	399	37.5%	11	1.0%	1,064	48%
Lawrence	6,449	65.3%	3,331	33.7%	98	1.0%	9,878	28%
Lee	1,272	63.9%	704	35.3%	16	0.8%	1,992	50%
Leicester	1,320	32.6%	2,682	66.1%	53	1.3%	1,992	56%
Lenox	1,532	71.7%	594	27.8%	12	0.6%	2,138	57%
Leominster	4,707	36.3%	8,127	62.6%	141	1.1%	12,975	47%
Leverett	779	81.9%	164	17.2%	8	0.8%	951	68%
Lexington	9,375	65.0%	4,953	34.4%	85	0.6%	14,413	68%
Leyden	211	64.1%	116	35.3%	2	0.6%	329	57%
Lincoln	1,928	67.9%	899	31.6%	14	0.5%	2,841	66%
Littleton	1,859	43.5%	2,389	55.9%	22	0.5%	4,270	69%
Longmeadow	3,158	42.7%	4,196	56.7%	47	0.6%	7,401	63%
Lowell	9,547	46.8%	10,548	51.7%	302	1.5%	20,397	38%
Ludlow	2,768	39.5%	4,159	59.3%	86	1.2%	7,013	51%
Lunenburg	1,530	34.3%	2,890	64.8%	43	1.0%	4,463	62%
Lynn	9,791	52.7%	8,595	46.2%	203	1.1%	18,589	38%
Lynnfield	1,620	28.6%	4,010	70.8%	37	0.7%	5,667	64%
Malden	7,794	56.0%	5,945	42.7%	186	1.3%	13,925	48%
Manchester	1,189	44.1%	1,494	55.4%	12	0.4%	2,695	70%
Mansfield	3,045	33.8%	5,909	65.5%	65	0.7%	9,019	63%
Marblehead	4,657	46.5%	5,285	52.8%	64	0.6%	10,006	69%
Marion	1,002	42.6%	1,332	56.7%	17	0.7%	2,351	64%
Marlborough	5,037	42.0%	6,817	56.9%	128	1.1%	11,982	59%
Marshfield	3,895	33.4%	7,677	65.8%	91	0.8%	11,663	66%
Mashpee	2,313	37.3%	3,835	61.8%	60	1.0%	6,208	61%
Mattapoisett	1,317	41.4%	1,834	57.7%	27	0.8%	3,178	65%
Maynard	2,231	51.1%	2,131	48.8%	2	0.0%	4,364	60%
Medfield	2,276	37.0%	3,842	62.4%	40	0.6%	6,158	74%
Medford	11,415	57.1%	8,381	41.9%	206	1.0%	20,002	57%
Medway	2,044	35.7%	3,641	63.6%	38	0.7%	5,723	64%
Melrose	5,861	48.7%	6,085	50.6%	91	0.8%	12,037	64%
Mendon	792	30.9%	1,750	68.3%	19	0.7%	2,561	62%
Merrimac	1,042	38.2%	1,651	60.5%	37	1.4%	2,730	62%
Methuen	4,837	34.2%	9,171	64.9%	117	0.8%	14,125	49%
Middleborough	2,615	29.6%	6,158	69.6%	76	0.9%	8,849	57%
Middlefield	126	51.9%	113	46.5%	4	1.6%	243	68%
Middleton	1,081	30.7%	2,412	68.6%	23	0.7%	3,516	64%
Milford	3,561	39.2%	5,432	59.8%	88	1.0%	9,081	55%
Millbury	1,655	34.3%	3,125	64.7%	49	1.0%	4,829	56%
Millis	1,383	36.0%	2,430	63.2%	31	0.8%	3,844	72%
Millville	323	28.4%	799	70.3%	14	1.2%	1,136	59%
Milton	6,436	50.0%	6,347	49.3%	86	0.7%	12,869	70%
Monroe	20	50.0%	19	47.5%	1	2.5%	40	56%
Monson	1,258	38.8%	1,933	59.6%	53	1.6%	3,244	57%
Montague	1,895	64.7%	985	33.6%	51	1.7%	2,931	51%
Monterey	296	73.8%	102	25.4%	3	0.7%	401	57%
Montgomery	123	31.2%	267	67.8%	4	1.0%	394	67%
Mount Washington	62	73.8%	21	25.0%	1	1.2%	84	66%
Nahant	877	49.5%	880	49.7%	13	0.7%	1,770	69%
Nantucket	2,139	50.6%	2,032	48.0%	58	1.4%	4,229	55%
Natick	7,208	50.5%	6,954	48.7%	125	0.9%	14,287	64%
Needham	7,654	52.4%	6,894	47.2%	59	0.4%	14,607	71%
New Ashford	68	62.4%	39	35.8%	2	1.8%	109	62%
New Bedford	11,754	59.0%	7,828	39.3%	339	1.7%	19,921	35%
New Braintree	169	36.8%	285	62.1%	5	1.1%	459	65%
Newbury	1,414	40.4%	2,048	58.5%	36	1.0%	3,498	68%
Newburyport	4,266	50.2%	4,174	49.1%	57	0.7%	8,497	65%
New Marlborough	366	61.1%	227	37.9%	6	1.0%	599	53%
New Salem	259	55.6%	195	41.8%	12	2.6%	466	60%
Newton	23,456	67.0%	11,352	32.4%	217	0.6%	35,025	63%
Norfolk	1,394	29.5%	3,308	69.9%	28	0.6%	4,730	75%
North Adams	2,854	74.1%	965	25.0%	34	0.9%	3,853	42%
Northampton	9,415	78.7%	2,447	20.4%	105	0.9%	11,967	61%
North Andover	3,826	35.0%	7,018	64.2%	80	0.7%	10,924	60%
North Attleborough	3,018	27.7%	7,778	71.5%	85	0.8%	10,881	59%
Northborough	2,486	39.1%	3,816	60.0%	61	1.0%	6,363	65%
Northbridge	1,638	28.7%	3,987	69.9%	76	1.3%	5,701	56%
North Brookfield	528	29.8%	1,225	69.2%	17	1.0%	1,770	55%
Northfield	744	58.4%	508	39.8%	23	1.8%	1,275	60%
North Reading	2,135	32.5%	4,373	66.6%	54	0.8%	6,562	64%
Norton	2,209	33.0%	4,424	66.1%	57	0.9%	6,690	59%
Norwell	1,680	32.3%	3,485	67.1%	32	0.6%	5,197	70%
Norwood	4,532	40.4%	6,568	58.6%	117	1.0%	11,217	57%
Oak Bluffs	1,177	60.9%	732	37.8%	25	1.3%	1,934	58%
Oakham	281	29.9%	645	68.6%	14	1.5%	940	71%
Orange	869	37.3%	1,416	60.9%	42	1.8%	2,327	48%
Orleans	1,705	46.2%	1,961	53.1%	26	0.7%	3,692	68%
Otis	265	47.8%	283	51.1%	6	1.1%	554	51%
Oxford	1,439	30.9%	3,151	67.7%	61	1.3%	4,651	54%
Palmer	1,622	38.3%	2,524	59.6%	91	2.1%	4,237	51%
Paxton	687	33.7%	1,331	65.4%	18	0.9%	2,036	65%
Peabody	7,619	39.6%	11,440	59.4%	191	1.0%	19,250	57%
Pelham	596	82.2%	126	17.4%	3	0.4%	725	63%
Pembroke	2,424	31.9%	5,134	67.6%	41	0.5%	7,599	61%
Pepperell	1,607	32.6%	3,279	66.6%	38	0.8%	4,924	61%
Peru	162	55.9%	125	43.1%	3	1.0%	290	49%
Petersham	306	45.6%	357	53.2%	8	1.2%	671	71%
Phillipston	235	33.0%	467	65.6%	10	1.4%	712	60%
Pittsfield	8,990	69.5%	3,803	29.4%	149	1.2%	12,942	45%
Plainfield	213	69.2%	91	29.5%	4	1.3%	308	69%
Plainville	971	28.0%	2,469	71.2%	30	0.9%	3,470	63%
Plymouth	7,989	35.6%	14,276	63.6%	176	0.8%	22,441	60%
Plympton	444	31.5%	951	67.5%	14	1.0%	1,409	70%
Princeton	681	36.6%	1,165	62.6%	16	0.9%	1,862	68%
Provincetown	1,344	84.1%	238	14.9%	16	1.0%	1,598	55%
Quincy	13,330	45.6%	15,607	53.3%	325	1.1%	29,262	47%
Randolph	5,996	61.2%	3,699	37.8%	100	1.0%	9,795	50%
Raynham	1,687	31.8%	3,574	67.3%	48	0.9%	5,309	58%
Reading	4,659	42.5%	6,225	56.8%	81	0.7%	10,965	66%
Rehoboth	1,538	33.0%	3,080	66.1%	44	0.9%	4,662	56%
Revere	5,021	45.8%	5,785	52.8%	150	1.4%	10,956	46%
Richmond	499	68.6%	220	30.3%	8	1.1%	727	63%
Rochester	776	31.3%	1,671	67.5%	30	1.2%	2,477	63%
Rockland	2,231	33.9%	4,253	64.7%	89	1.4%	6,573	56%
Rockport	1,879	52.5%	1,667	46.6%	34	0.9%	3,580	64%
Rowe	97	50.5%	89	46.4%	6	3.1%	192	63%
Rowley	893	32.3%	1,845	66.8%	26	0.9%	2,764	66%
Royalston	213	40.6%	298	56.9%	13	2.5%	524	59%
Russell	195	33.3%	379	64.8%	11	1.9%	585	57%
Rutland	1,029	30.6%	2,307	68.6%	25	0.7%	3,361	64%
Salem	6,650	53.1%	5,726	45.7%	154	1.2%	12,530	50%
Salisbury	1,061	35.0%	1,927	63.6%	42	1.4%	3,030	51%
Sandisfield	150	50.0%	146	48.7%	4	1.3%	300	52%
Sandwich	3,416	33.8%	6,625	65.6%	61	0.6%	10,102	65%
Saugus	3,587	35.9%	6,315	63.2%	96	1.0%	9,998	58%
Savoy	131	54.8%	104	43.5%	4	1.7%	239	46%
Scituate	3,474	38.1%	5,584	61.2%	61	0.7%	9,119	69%
Seekonk	1,911	37.6%	3,133	61.7%	36	0.7%	5,080	53%
Sharon	4,461	55.4%	3,536	43.9%	61	0.8%	8,058	66%
Sheffield	822	63.9%	448	34.8%	16	1.2%	1,286	57%
Shelburne	588	68.4%	263	30.6%	9	1.0%	860	62%
Sherborn	1,061	45.2%	1,269	54.1%	17	0.7%	2,347	77%
Shirley	868	35.7%	1,525	62.7%	38	1.6%	2,431	62%
Shrewsbury	5,242	39.7%	7,867	59.5%	104	0.8%	13,213	60%
Shutesbury	771	82.5%	158	16.9%	5	0.5%	934	65%
Somerset	3,553	48.5%	3,706	50.5%	73	1.0%	7,332	54%
Somerville	16,965	74.8%	5,462	24.1%	261	1.2%	22,688	54%
Southampton	1,052	40.2%	1,533	58.5%	34	1.3%	2,619	65%
Southborough	1,845	40.4%	2,689	58.9%	33	0.7%	4,567	69%
Southbridge	1,748	42.5%	2,271	55.2%	98	2.4%	4,117	34%
South Hadley	3,227	47.7%	3,434	50.8%	102	1.5%	6,763	59%
Southwick	1,074	29.8%	2,469	68.6%	56	1.6%	3,599	53%
Spencer	1,237	30.8%	2,727	67.9%	53	1.3%	4,017	52%
Springfield	17,610	61.4%	10,630	37.1%	432	1.5%	28,672	32%
Sterling	1,174	31.0%	2,569	67.8%	44	1.2%	3,787	67%
Stockbridge	672	74.1%	224	24.7%	11	1.2%	907	61%
Stoneham	3,634	39.6%	5,473	59.6%	75	0.8%	9,182	61%
Stoughton	4,466	43.9%	5,616	55.2%	84	0.8%	10,166	58%
Stow	1,595	46.8%	1,789	52.5%	24	0.7%	3,408	73%
Sturbridge	1,350	35.1%	2,454	63.8%	44	1.1%	3,848	60%
Sudbury	4,291	51.0%	4,078	48.5%	41	0.5%	8,410	71%
Sunderland	842	66.6%	410	32.4%	12	0.9%	1,264	53%
Sutton	1,136	27.6%	2,931	71.3%	43	1.0%	1,264	62%
Swampscott	3,121	48.7%	3,222	50.2%	72	1.1%	6,415	63%
Swansea	2,449	42.1%	3,297	56.7%	73	1.3%	5,819	51%
Taunton	6,586	41.8%	8,925	56.7%	228	1.4%	15,739	48%
Templeton	886	32.3%	1,814	66.1%	44	1.6%	2,744	55%
Tewksbury	3,381	31.2%	7,353	67.9%	90	0.8%	10,824	54%
Tisbury	1,172	66.2%	579	32.7%	19	1.1%	1,770	58%
Tolland	56	25.7%	158	72.5%	4	1.8%	218	64%
Topsfield	1,117	35.7%	1,993	63.6%	22	0.7%	3,132	75%
Townsend	1,092	29.2%	2,618	69.9%	36	1.0%	3,746	59%
Truro	673	62.5%	396	36.8%	7	0.7%	1,076	64%
Tyngsborough	1,452	31.0%	3,186	68.0%	45	1.0%	4,683	59%
Tyringham	131	61.2%	82	38.3%	1	0.5%	214	68%
Upton	1,138	34.5%	2,125	64.5%	32	1.0%	3,295	67%
Uxbridge	1,651	30.6%	3,690	68.3%	58	1.1%	5,399	56%
Wakefield	4,411	39.0%	6,815	60.3%	82	0.7%	11,308	67%
Wales	244	34.9%	441	63.0%	15	2.1%	700	55%
Walpole	3,565	31.7%	7,604	67.7%	64	0.6%	11,233	69%
Waltham	8,523	49.5%	8,546	49.6%	157	0.9%	17,226	49%
Ware	1,127	37.7%	1,785	59.7%	80	2.7%	2,992	47%
Wareham	3,128	39.8%	4,628	58.9%	101	1.3%	7,857	52%
Warren	594	36.7%	986	60.9%	38	2.3%	1,618	52%
Warwick	207	61.8%	123	36.7%	5	1.5%	335	60%
Washington	160	63.0%	91	35.8%	3	1.2%	254	60%
Watertown	7,301	61.2%	4,520	37.9%	100	0.8%	11,921	55%
Wayland	3,597	54.9%	2,915	44.5%	38	0.6%	6,550	65%
Webster	1,541	33.6%	2,977	64.8%	74	1.6%	4,592	40%
Wellesley	5,934	49.8%	5,922	49.7%	48	0.4%	11,904	68%
Wellfleet	1,075	63.4%	596	35.1%	25	1.5%	1,696	64%
Wendell	338	79.7%	79	18.6%	7	1.7%	424	61%
Wenham	674	36.0%	1,184	63.3%	12	0.6%	1,870	66%
Westborough	3,009	43.6%	3,831	55.5%	60	0.9%	6,900	60%
West Boylston	1,133	35.2%	2,044	63.6%	38	1.2%	3,215	66%
West Bridgewater	842	27.4%	2,211	71.9%	21	0.7%	3,074	61%
West Brookfield	523	36.1%	907	62.6%	18	1.2%	1,448	55%
Westfield	4,542	36.4%	7,772	62.2%	172	1.4%	12,486	53%
Westford	3,887	39.4%	5,930	60.1%	57	0.6%	9,874	66%
Westhampton	414	48.5%	429	50.3%	10	1.2%	853	69%
Westminster	1,021	31.4%	2,202	67.8%	26	0.8%	3,249	60%
West Newbury	906	41.2%	1,281	58.3%	12	0.5%	2,199	68%
Weston	2,424	46.2%	2,794	53.2%	30	0.6%	5,248	67%
Westport	2,898	46.9%	3,203	51.8%	77	1.2%	6,178	54%
West Springfield	3,145	37.5%	5,102	60.9%	131	1.6%	8,378	50%
West Stockbridge	473	73.6%	165	25.7%	5	0.8%	643	62%
West Tisbury	1,033	74.2%	347	24.9%	13	0.9%	1,393	61%
Westwood	2,953	39.6%	4,465	59.8%	47	0.6%	7,465	74%
Weymouth	8,104	34.6%	15,093	64.4%	235	1.0%	23,432	69%
Whately	420	56.8%	305	41.3%	14	1.9%	739	65%
Whitman	1,683	30.9%	3,724	68.4%	37	0.7%	5,444	58%
Wilbraham	2,216	34.0%	4,237	65.1%	58	0.9%	6,511	63%
Williamsburg	895	70.5%	355	28.0%	19	1.5%	1,269	64%
Williamstown	2,100	77.1%	612	22.5%	10	0.4%	2,722	60%
Wilmington	3,057	32.6%	6,225	66.5%	81	0.9%	9,363	60%
Winchendon	986	33.5%	1,908	64.8%	51	1.7%	2,945	43%
Winchester	4,876	47.8%	5,248	51.5%	68	0.7%	10,192	68%
Windsor	252	63.8%	141	35.7%	2	0.5%	395	59%
Winthrop	2,902	44.2%	3,596	54.7%	71	1.1%	6,569	56%
Woburn	5,635	39.9%	8,363	59.1%	142	1.0%	14,140	57%
Worcester	19,861	51.9%	17,889	46.7%	532	1.4%	38,282	42%
Worthington	335	58.8%	229	40.2%	6	1.1%	570	63%
Wrentham	1,414	26.5%	3,880	72.7%	41	0.8%	5,335	71%
Yarmouth	4,390	40.0%	6,496	59.1%	98	0.9%	10,984	60%
Massachusetts	1,058,682	47.1%	1,168,107	51.9%	22,237	1.0%	2,249,026	54%

Notes: Totals do not include all absentee ballots; the final tally is not due until ten days after the election, or January 29, 2010.
Median rank (176), average turnout (54%), closest to average percentages for Brown and Coakley (both in Westport)
and closest to average size of total vote (6,415 in Swampscott) have been shaded to show midpoints when sorting the table.
Source: "2010 Massachusetts US Senate Special Election Results". Boston Globe. January 19, 2010.

== Analysis ==
With his victory, Brown became the first Republican to win this seat since 1946, and the first to win either Massachusetts Senate seat since 1972. This is the only time a Republican was elected to Congress from Massachusetts since Peter Blute and Peter Torkildsen won re-election to the House in 1994. This election was the first time since 1946 that the winner of Massachusetts's Class 1 Senate seat was not a member of the Kennedy family. After the election, senior Brown adviser Eric Fehrnstrom stated that the turning point for Brown was the December 30 "JFK ad" which put the campaign on the map. "After that, it was like riding a rocket ship for 2½ to 3 weeks till today," he said. Another widely aired Brown TV ad featured him crisscrossing the state in his 2005 GMC Canyon pickup truck, which had amassed nearly 200,000 miles on the odometer. In his victory speech, Brown said "I'm Scott Brown. I'm from Wrentham. I drive a truck."

Another critical event in the Brown surge was his debate performance on January 11. When asked by moderator David Gergen why he would oppose health care reform while holding the "Kennedy seat," Brown replied, "It's not the Kennedy seat and it's not the Democrats' seat. It's the people's seat." After the debate, "people's seat" became a rallying cry for Brown supporters.

Brown's late surge was made possible by support by conservative bloggers, who immediately after the Massachusetts primary began promoting his candidacy among national conservative activists, who sought to challenge the Democrats in every election. At the same time, national Republicans were not publicly targeting the campaign, leading one paper to claim Brown was "left to fend for himself." Undaunted, the Brown campaign succeeded through its moneybomb in raising millions of dollars from Internet donations down the stretch run of the campaign.

Barack Obama named Coakley's disastrous rhetorical question about whether she ought to stand outside Fenway Park in the cold shaking hands as a defining moment for his presidency and for his healthcare proposal; to Obama, it reflected Coakley's inept handling of a race that should have been easily winnable.

Coakley's defeat was considered a major upset. Her defeat cost her own party a U.S. Senate supermajority and "turned her into a political pariah and the butt of 'Saturday Night Live' sketches".

Brown's unexpected victory "sent shock waves through the electoral landscape. Democrats in the Senate lost the 60th seat, imperiling their carefully crafted deal on health insurance reform and requiring serious reflection on what went wrong and how to correct it". Democratic commentators "blamed Coakley’s lackluster campaign effort" for the election outcome.

=== National response ===
The election was viewed by conservatives outside of Massachusetts as a referendum against President Barack Obama. However, Brown stated that he didn't believe that it was a referendum on Obama.

=== Response from Democrats ===
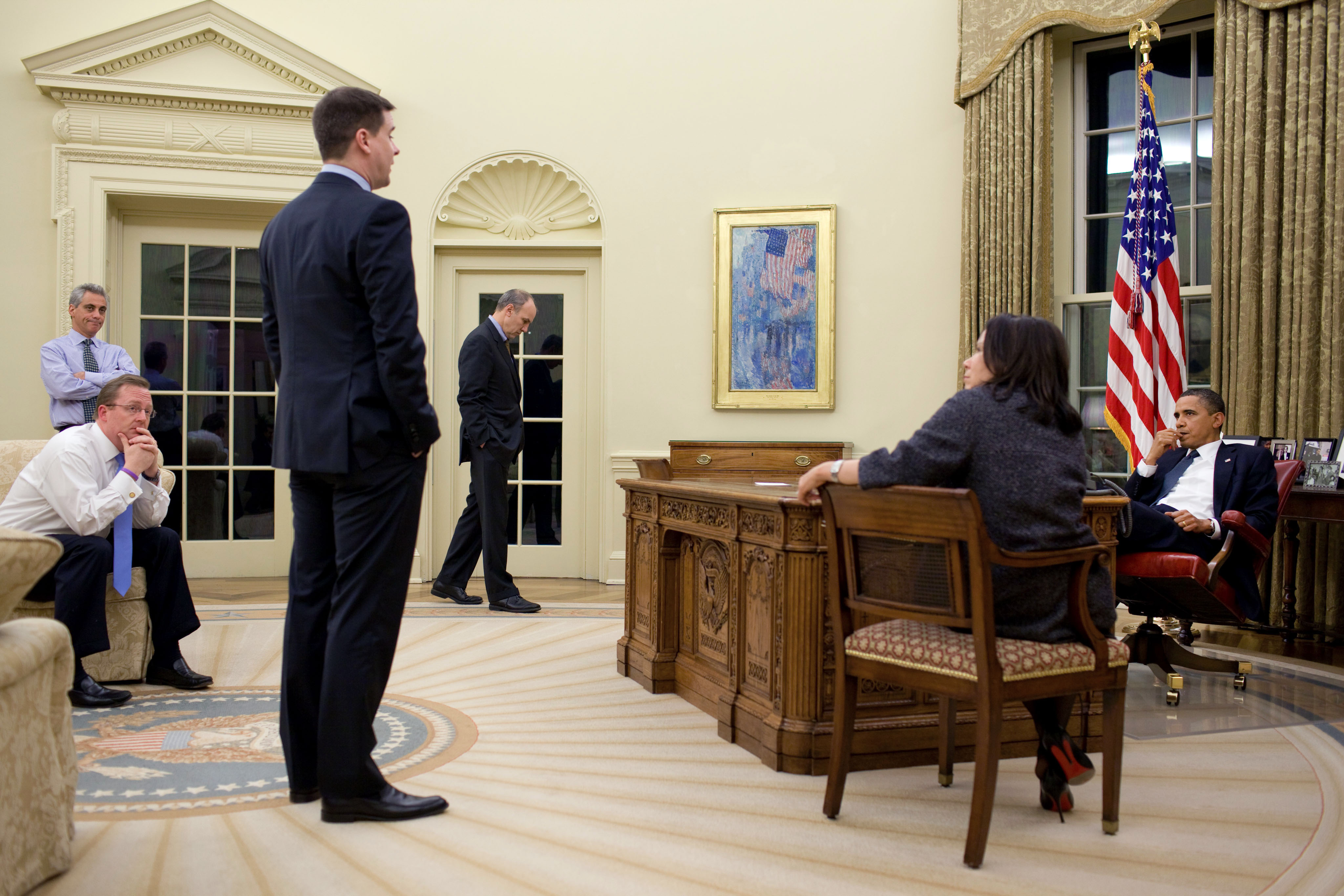
Obama and his aides discuss Brown's win and the loss of a filibuster-proof super-majority in the Senate.

- President Barack Obama, via political advisor David Axelrod – "I think that there were a lot of elements to the message [in the election]. Health care was part of it."
- Jim Webb (D-VA) – "The race was a referendum not only on health care reform but also on the openness and integrity of our government process. It is vital that we restore the respect of the American people in our system of government and in our leaders. To that end, I believe it would only be fair and prudent that we suspend further votes on health care legislation until Senator-elect Brown is seated."
- Steny Hoyer (D-MD) – "We will all be making a mistake if we believe that the message that was delivered in Massachusetts last night was unique to Massachusetts. That anger was directed, frankly, at all of us."

=== Response from Republicans ===
Republicans were elated at the election result.

- John Cornyn (R-TX) – "Democrats nationwide should be on notice: Americans are ready to hold the party in power accountable for their irresponsible spending and out-of-touch agenda, and they're ready for real change in Washington. This is very energizing to a lot of people, Republicans and independents."
- Mitch McConnell (R-KY) – "There's a reason the nation was focused on this race. The American people have made it abundantly clear that they're more interested in shrinking unemployment than expanding government. They're tired of bailouts. They're tired of the government spending more than ever at a time when most people are spending less. And they don't want the government taking over health care."
- John Boehner (R-OH) – "For nine months, I've talked to you about the political rebellion that's been brewing in America. It manifested itself in August at town hall meetings around the country. We saw it manifest itself in what happened in Virginia and New Jersey back in November. And we saw it manifest itself again last night in Massachusetts, when the people of Massachusetts stood up and said, 'enough is enough.' And it's pretty clear that while the American people continue to speak, the Democrat leadership here in this House continues to ignore them and is looking for some way to continue to press this health care bill to a vote."
- Eric Cantor (R-VA) – "The American people, the people of Massachusetts last night have rejected the arrogance. They are tired of being told by Washington how to think and what to do,"
- John McCain (R-AZ) – "Last night, a shot was fired around this nation: saying no more business as usual in Washington, D.C."
- Olympia Snowe (R-ME) – "I never say anything is dead, but I think that clearly they're going to have to revisit the entire issue. I think that was true from the outset. I think there were a lot of concerns that ultimately, collectively manifested themselves in yesterday's vote. The American people are rightfully frustrated and they should be. This process is not becoming of this institution, the United States Congress. You can't drive a policy that doesn't have the support of the American people."

== See also ==
- List of United States senators from Massachusetts
- 2017 United States Senate special election in Alabama
- 2021 Virginia gubernatorial election
