= Stephen Pagliuca =

American businessman (born 1955)

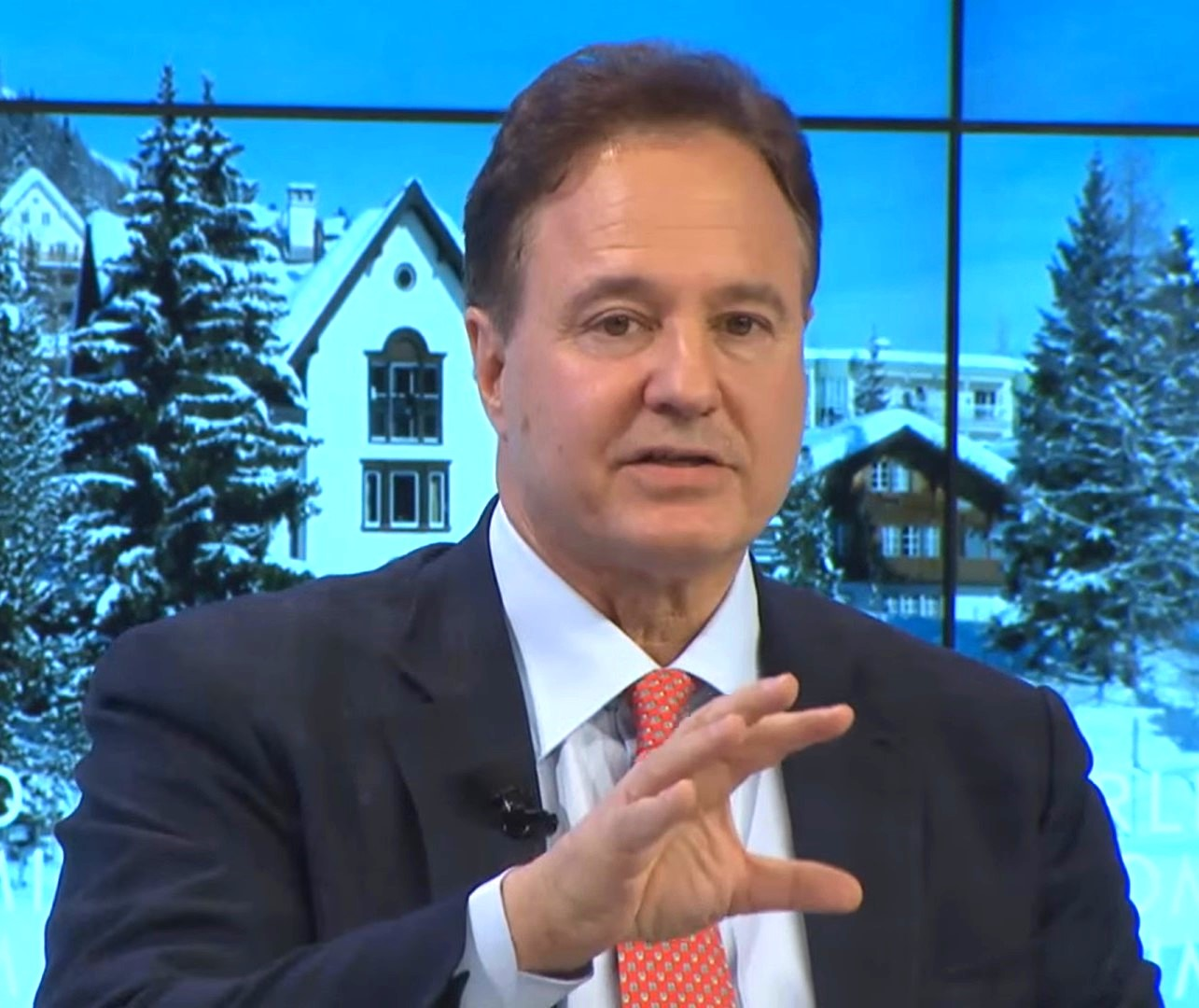
- Pagliuca in 2016

Personal details
- Born: January 16, 1955 (age 71) New York City, US
- Party: Democratic Party
- Education: Duke University; Harvard University

Stephen Gerard Pagliuca (born January 16, 1955) is an American private equity investor, co-chairman of Bain Capital, and owner of Atalanta of Italian Serie A association football league. He is also former co-owner of the Boston Celtics of the National Basketball Association (NBA).

== Education ==
Raised in the Basking Ridge section of Bernards Township, New Jersey, Pagliuca graduated from Ridge High School in 1973. He attended Duke University where he played freshman basketball before receiving a BA in 1977. He has served on Duke's Trinity Board of Investors from 2001 to 2008, chairing the board from 2005 to 2007. He is a member of the Campaign Steering Committee and also serves on the board of trustees, serving on the Audit Committee and the Institutional Advancement Committee.

Pagliuca received an MBA from Harvard Business School (HBS) in 1982. He is member of the HBS Board of Dean's Advisors, the University Board of Overseers Committee on University Resources and the HBS Healthcare Initiative Advisory Board. He serves on the MGH President's Council and co-chairs the HBS Fund.

== Career ==
Pagliuca started his career as a senior accountant and international tax specialist at Peat Marwick Mitchell & Company in the Netherlands (Peat Marwick is today KPMG).

Following this, he joined Bain & Company, a global consulting firm, in 1982 where he managed client relationships in the information services and healthcare industries. Pagliuca also was involved in the creation of Bain & Company's turnaround practice. He then founded the Information Partners Venture Capital Fund and joined Bain Capital in 1989, where he began investing in numerous companies in the media, technology, financial services and healthcare industries. In 2016, he was named co-chairman of the firm.

He is a former member of the Board of Directors of Burger King, Warner Chilcott, Gartner Group and the Hospital Corporation of America.

== Politics ==
In 2010, Pagliuca was a Democratic candidate for the special election for the U.S. Senate seat formerly occupied by Ted Kennedy, who had died the previous August. He finished fourth of four candidates in the Democratic primary, behind Attorney General Martha Coakley, congressman Mike Capuano, and businessman Alan Khazei. Pagliuca received 12% of the vote.

He is a member of Congressman Joe Kennedy's Finance Committee, the Campaign to Fix the Debt and the Democratic National Advisory Committee.

== Sports ownership ==
=== Boston Celtics ===
Pagliuca was a member of Boston Basketball Partners, the ownership group of the Boston Celtics. He was the managing general partner and member of the executive committee of the Celtics and serves as a member of the Board of Governors and the Competition Committee for the National Basketball Association.

When Boston Basketball Partners managing general partner H. Irving Grousbeck announced plans to sell the team, Pagliuca announced he would submit a bid to become majority owner. Pagliuca's bid was ultimately not chosen, with the Grousbecks choosing to sell to the team to Bill Chisholm.

=== Atalanta ===
In early 2022, Pagliuca, together with a number of other investors, acquired a 55% stake of Italian Serie A association football club Atalanta. Under the new agreement, Pagliuca was named co-chairman of the club.

=== Connecticut Sun ===
On August 2, 2025, The Boston Globe reported that Pagliuca would be purchasing the Women's National Basketball Association's Connecticut Sun with the intention of moving the team to Boston.

== Philanthropy ==
Pagliuca is a member of HBS’ Board of Dean's Advisors, Harvard University's Board of Overseers’ Committee on University Resources, the HBS Healthcare Initiative Advisory Board and co-chair of the HBS Fund. He is a member of Duke University's board of trustees and serves on Massachusetts General Hospital's President's Council.

In 2005, Pagliuca received the Bright Star Award as recognition for his charitable activities from Bill Clinton. In 2010, Habitat for Humanity presented him with the American Dream Award for outstanding contributions to the Greater Boston Community.

He was co-chair of the Boston 2024 Olympics Finance Committee until Boston's bid for the 2024 Olympics was thrown out by the IOC.

In 2016, Pagliuca and his wife donated a research lab to Harvard University, the Pagliuca Life Lab.

== See also ==
- Bain Capital
- Boston Celtics
- United States Senate special election in Massachusetts, 2010
