= Vanessa Kirsch =

American social entrepreneur

Vanessa Kirsch is an American social entrepreneur who is the founder and co-CEO of New Profit, a venture philanthropy fund based in Boston, Massachusetts. She also founded and formerly led Public Allies, a national youth service organization, and the Women’s Information Network, an organization that provides support, training, and political access to young women.

== Early and personal life ==
Kirsch grew up in Cambridge, Massachusetts, with her mother, a painter, and her father, an inventor and professor. Because of dyslexia, Kirsch struggled through school and was told she was not a candidate for her first-choice college, Tufts University. However, her tenacity and drive, which she described in a letter to the admissions office, was enough to gain her admittance to the University, where she served as a Tufts Community Union Senator and student member of the Board of Trustees.

Kirsch is the wife of Alan Khazei, founder of City Year and Be the Change and former candidate in the Massachusetts 2009 special election to fill the Class 1 seat in the United States Senate made vacant by the death of Senator Ted Kennedy. Kirsch serves on the Board of Advocates to Tufts University's Jonathan M. Tisch College of Citizenship and Public Service, and on the Boards of College Summit and Stand for Children.

== Career ==
Kirsch founded the Women’s Information Network (WIN) in 1989 to provide support, training, and political access to young women in Washington, D.C.

In 1992, Kirsch and Katrina Browne founded Public Allies, a federally-funded program that links youth volunteers with nonprofit organizations in their communities. While under Kirsch’s leadership, the organization grew to six cities, including Chicago. The organization was named by the Bush Administration as one of eight model national service programs in America. The Clinton Administration also recognized Public Allies as an official AmeriCorps national service model.

Kirsch then took a year to travel the world, interviewing social entrepreneurs and citizens across 22 countries and cultures. Through this experience, she came to understand that the nonprofit sector lacked sufficient access to second-stage growth capital, locking social entrepreneurs and their funders into a start-up phase mentality. She determined that in order for social entrepreneurs to have the greatest possible impact, they needed access to financial capital that could allow them to sustain and grow successful, tested program models. In 1996, she began laying the groundwork for a venture philanthropy fund that would serve social entrepreneurs and their organizations by providing them with funding and valuable strategic consulting services. After over a year of research and development with a team of social entrepreneurs, academics, and philanthropists, Kirsch and a partner founded New Profit in 1998. With support from Monitor Group, New Profit has worked with 27 nonprofit organizations.

In 1988, Kirsch worked on Michael Dukakis's presidential campaign as a convention manager and field coordinator. Later, Kirsch worked briefly with Peter Hart of Peter D. Hart Research Associates, a polling firm, where she led several projects including a study on young people's civic attitudes.

== Awards and recognition ==
- Fast Company named Kirsch as a member of "Who's Fast 2000"
- In 2002, Forbes recognized Kirsch as one of 15 innovators who will reinvent the future
- Boston Business Journal recognized Kirsch as a member of the "40 Under 40" most promising leaders in Boston in 2004
- Ernst & Young named Kirsch 2005 "Entrepreneur of the Year" in the category of Social Entrepreneurship
- Duke University's Center for the Advancement of Social Entrepreneurship recognized Kirsch with the 2010 Leadership in Social Entrepreneurship Award
