= Travis Rejman =

Travis Rejman (born in Waterloo, Iowa, United States) is the American Co-Founder and Executive Director of The Goldin Institute, a Chicago-based non-profit organization that works to foster global grassroots partnerships for sustainable change.

== Career ==
The Goldin Institute focuses on areas of poverty alleviation, gender empowerment, conflict resolution and environmental sustainability. He began working door to door as an environmental community organizer for issues concerning government, business, as well as civil society. Before the foundation of the Institute, Travis worked in the Interfaith field serving as Director of Programs for the Council for a Parliament of the World's Religions. Among the programs he developed were the 1999 Parliament in Cape Town, South Africa and the 2004 Parliament in Barcelona, Spain.

Rejman worked as a part of the organization Public Allies from 1994 to 1995, under the direction of Michelle Obama. Obama was the Founding Executive Director of Public Allies Chicago. Rejman appeared and spoke in the video South Side Girl that introduced Michelle Obama at the Democratic National Convention in 2008.

Based on his work in Uganda building a National Platform for Child Soldier Reintegration and Prevention, Rejman's perspective on the Kony 2012 campaign was featured in the Huffington Post on March 9, 2012.
