= 1946 United States Senate election in Massachusetts =

- November 5, 1946
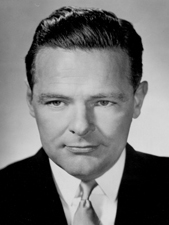

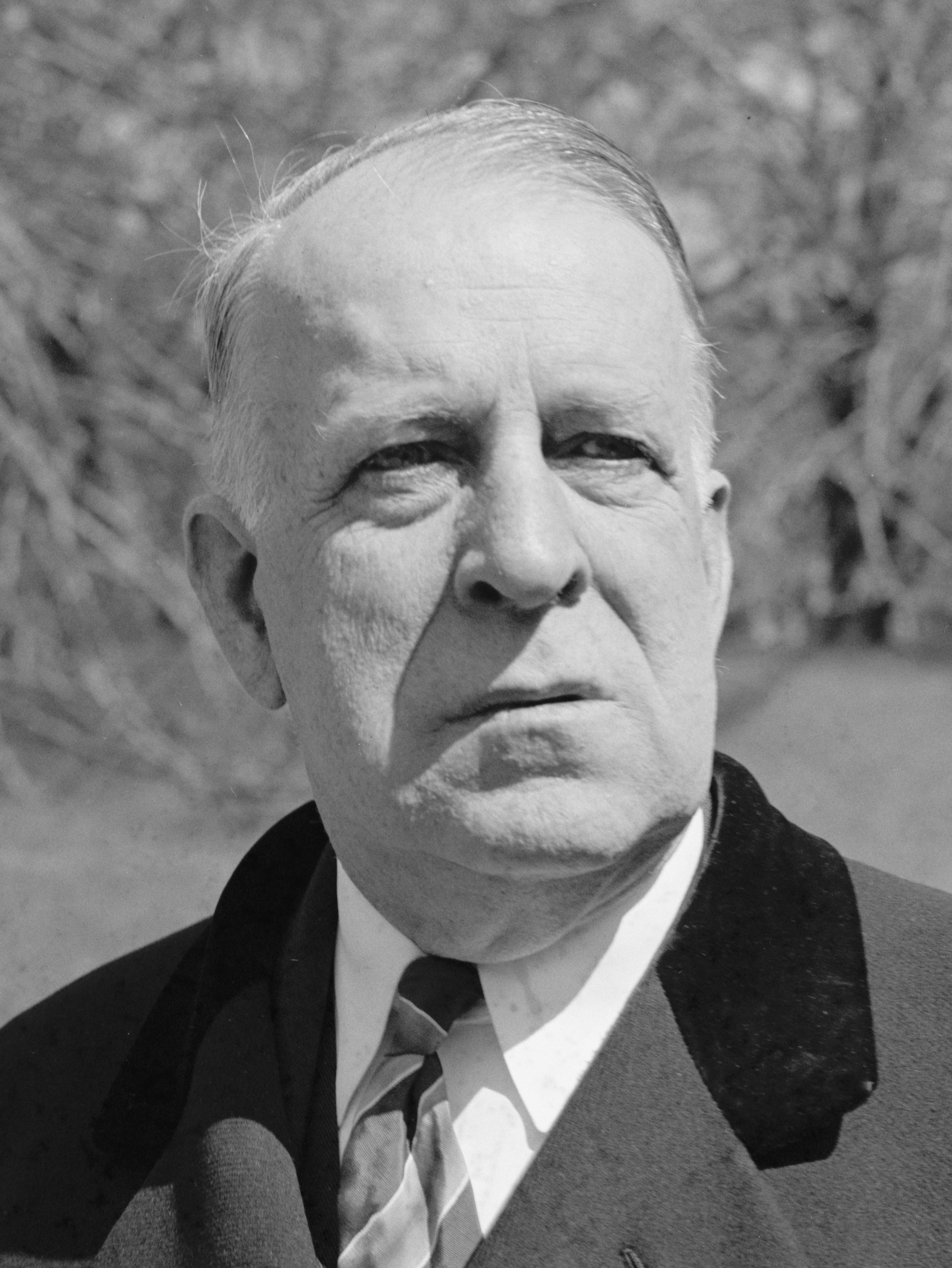
Nominee	Henry Cabot Lodge Jr.	David I. Walsh
Party	Republican	Democratic
Popular vote	989,736	660,200
Percentage	59.55%	39.72%
- Lodge: 40–50% 50–60% 60–70% 70–80% 80–90% 90–100% Walsh: 50–60% 60–70%
U.S. senator before election
David I. Walsh
Democratic
Elected U.S. Senator
Henry Cabot Lodge Jr.
Republican

The 1946 United States Senate election in Massachusetts was held on November 5, 1946. Incumbent Democratic Senator David I. Walsh ran for re-election to a fifth term (Note: Walsh had served three consecutive terms since 1929 in addition to a fourth nonconsecutive term from 1917 to 1923.) in office, but was defeated by Republican former Senator Henry Cabot Lodge Jr., who returned from service in World War II.

A Republican would not hold this Senate seat until Scott Brown, who was elected to serve a partial term in 2010. As of 2023, this remains the last time that a Republican has won a full term in this seat.

== Background ==
Henry Cabot Lodge Jr. was elected to two terms in the U.S. Senate in 1936 and 1942, but resigned during his second term to serve in World War II. With the completion of the war in Europe, Lodge returned to Massachusetts and to politics.

David I. Walsh had served four terms in office since his election as an ally of Woodrow Wilson in 1918 but had alienated New Deal supporters by opposing the labor and social reform measures of the Second New Deal. He was also embroiled in a personal scandal after the owner of a Brooklyn homosexual brothel allegedly frequented by German spies had sworn under oath that Walsh was his client. Though an official Federal Bureau of Investigation report failed to reveal any wrongdoing, the investigation did find substantial "derogatory information" regarding Walsh, and the scandal hung over his head.

== Democratic primary ==
=== Candidates ===
- David I. Walsh, incumbent Senator since 1926 (Note: Walsh had previously served in the Senate from 1919 to 1925.)

Given his poor relationship with President Harry S. Truman, Walsh anticipated that the White House might support an opponent in a Democratic primary, but no opponent materialized.

=== Results ===
Despite the brothel scandal, he faced no opposition at the Democratic convention, which was the shortest recorded. The convention started at 2 P.M., to allow delegates to attend the funeral of Walsh's sister Hannah, and finished by 5 P.M. Walsh did not attend and there was no debate over his nomination, though Attorney General nominee Paul Dever devoted his own speech to praising Walsh's record.

1946 Democratic U.S. Senate primary
Party	Candidate	Votes	%
Democratic	David I. Walsh (incumbent)	194,323	99.99%
Write-in		28	0.01%
None	Blank votes	93,302	–
Turnout		287,653	100.00

== Republican primary ==
=== Candidates ===
- Henry Cabot Lodge Jr., former Senator (1937–1944)

=== Results ===
Lodge was unopposed for the Republican nomination. He was heavily recruited by the state Republican Party, which sought to counter the supposed popularity of Walsh and Governor Maurice J. Tobin. A formal declaration of candidacy was submitted to the Secretary of the Commonwealth in April.

1946 Republican U.S. Senate primary
Party	Candidate	Votes	%
Republican	Henry Cabot Lodge Jr.	186,376	100.00%
Write-in		8	0.00%
None	Blank votes	24,331	–
Turnout		210,715	100.00

== General election ==
=== Candidates ===
- Henning A. Blomen, perennial candidate (Socialist Labor)
- Henry Cabot Lodge Jr., former Senator (1937–1944) (Republican)
- Mark R. Shaw, temperance activist and pastor from Beverly (Prohibition)
- David I. Walsh, incumbent Senator since 1926

=== Campaign ===
Lodge, who considered Walsh a family friend, avoided mentioning his opponent's alleged homosexuality or impropriety. He centered his campaign on criticism of postwar economic conditions, arguing that inflation, labor strife, and consumer goods shortages were leading the country toward "another depression".

=== Results ===
United States Senate election in Massachusetts, 1946
Party	Candidate	Votes	%	±%
Republican	Henry Cabot Lodge Jr.	989,736	59.55%	▲17.17
Democratic	David I. Walsh (incumbent)	660,200	39.72%	▼15.92
Socialist Labor	Henning A. Blomen	9,221	0.56%	▲0.35
Prohibition	Mark R. Shaw	2,898	0.17%	▼0.32
Total votes		1,662,055	100.0%	

Lodge carried every county and the city of Boston.

== Aftermath ==
Five months after leaving office, Walsh died following a cerebral hemorrhage in Boston on June 11, 1947.
