= Edward M. Kennedy Serve America Act =

2009 Act of Congress

- Long title: An act entitled The Edward M. Kennedy Serve America Act, an Act to reauthorize and reform the national service laws.
- Enacted by: the 111th United States Congress
- Effective: April 21, 2009

Codification
- Acts amended: National and Community Service Act of 1990, Domestic Volunteer Service Act of 1973, Inspector General Act of 1978
- Titles amended: 5, 42

Legislative history
- Introduced in the House of Representatives as H.R. 1388 by Carolyn McCarthy (D–NY) on March 9, 2009; Committee consideration by Education and Labor; Passed the House on March 18, 2009 (321–105); Passed the Senate on March 26, 2009 (79–19) with amendment; House agreed to Senate amendment on March 31, 2009 (279–149); Signed into law by President Barack Obama on April 21, 2009

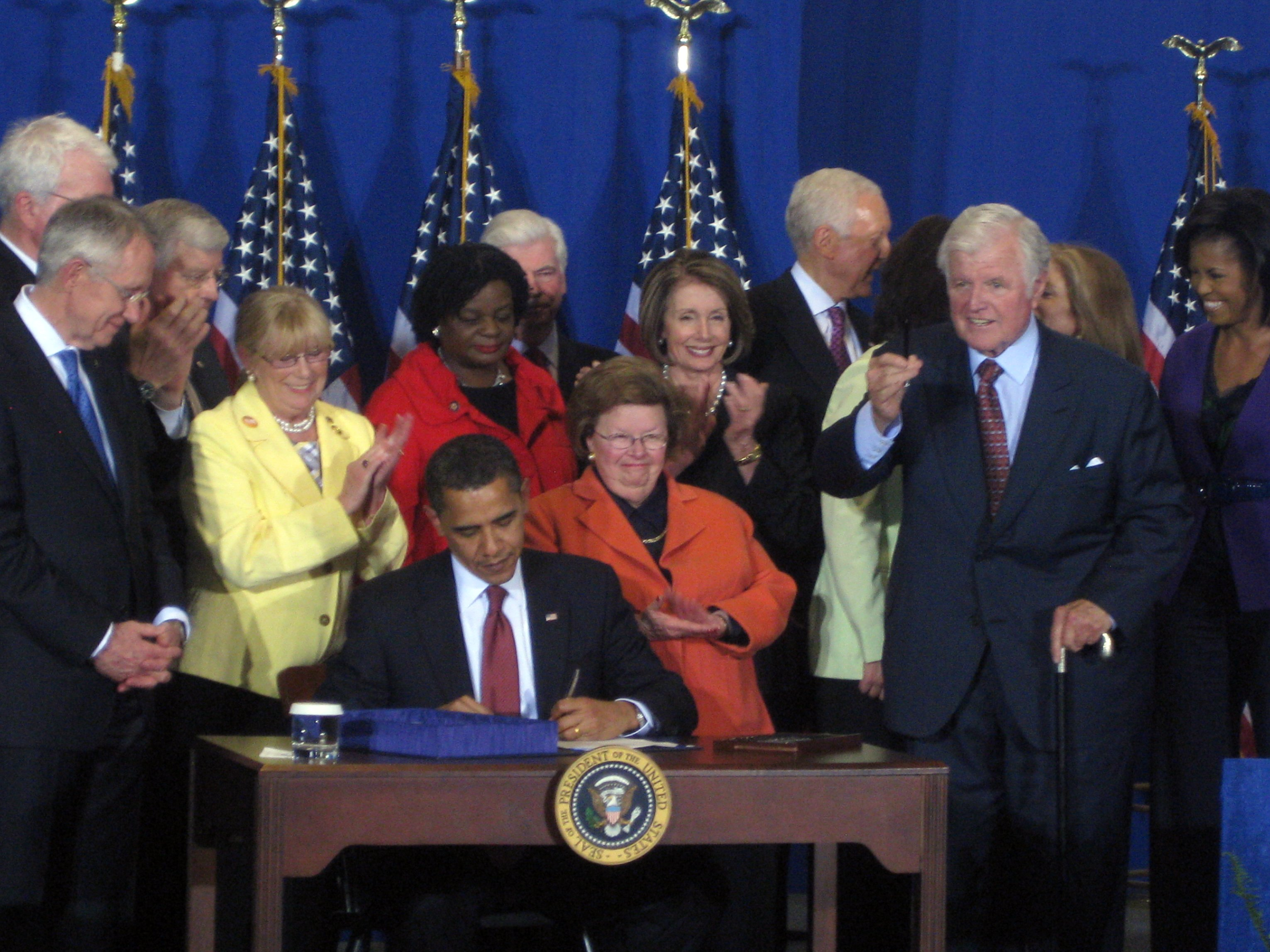
Barack Obama signing the Act

The Edward M. Kennedy Serve America Act or Serve America Act (H.R. 1388, Public Law 111-13) was introduced in the United States House of Representatives on March 9, 2009, by Representative Carolyn McCarthy of New York. Originally titled the Generations Invigorating Volunteerism and Education Act (GIVE Act), the bill reauthorizes and expands the AmeriCorps program that was first established in 1993. It passed in the House of Representatives on March 18, 2009. The U.S. Senate debated and approved an amended version of the bill on March 26, 2009, renaming it the Edward M. Kennedy Serve America Act, after Senator Ted Kennedy. The House of Representatives voted on the bill a second time, approving the amended version on March 31, 2009. It was signed by President Barack Obama on April 21, 2009.

== Volunteerism provisions ==
Included in this bill are some major provisions related to improving volunteerism. First, five new service corps are created which address the needs of low income communities. These include a Clean Energy Corps to encourage energy efficiency and conservation; an Education Corps to help increase student engagement, achievement and graduation; a Healthy Futures Corps to improve health care access; a Veterans Corps to enhance services for veterans; and an Opportunity Corps.

The bill expanded the number of volunteers nationwide from 75,000 to 250,000. Under the Serve America Act, AmeriCorps's list of programs was expanded. The list now includes giving access to technology, disaster services, mentoring, giving services to disadvantaged youth, higher education service-learning, re-engaging court-involved youth and adults, providing financial literacy education, building affordable housing, providing access to health care and other State and Federal programs, establishing e-Corps, giving job-training and helping with job placement, helping to reduce crime, creating a musician and artist corps program, and providing foster care and mentoring. Much of the Serve America Act discusses funding and how grants can be provided to non-profit organizations through AmeriCorps.

The bill expands the focus of the National Civilian Community Corps (NCCC) to include disaster relief, infrastructure improvement, environmental and energy conservation, and urban and rural development. The bill requires 50% of the NCCC's summer program participants to be from economically and ethnically diverse background. Additionally, this bill creates the National Service Reserve Corps of former national service participants and veterans who are capable of being called to service in the event of disaster or other emergencies.

The bill instructs the NCCC to start a Call to Service Campaign, in order to encourage all Americans to engage in service, as well as marking September 11 as a National Day of Service and Remembrance, of which the NCCC is responsible for planning. It also creates the Campuses of Service which supports and recognizes institutions of higher education with exemplary service learning programs and helps students in the pursuit of public service careers.

The bill also increased the Segal AmeriCorps Education Award that members receive in exchange for their work to $5,350 for 2010. This award value is associated with the maximum Pell Grant scholarship.

== Community engagement provisions ==
The Youth Engagement Zones created under the bill provides for a new service-learning program to engage low-income high school students and out-of-school youth in volunteer efforts to make change in relation to challenges in their local community. Additionally a Summer of Service, which allows for rising 6-12 graders who complete 100 hours of service in an approved position to receive a monetary award is created. Also, the Semester of Service is established which gives high school students the opportunity to participate in service learning for at least 70 hours in a semester to engage lower-income students.

The Social Innovations Fund grants funding to new initiatives, and allows the federal government to give money to private and philanthropic organizations to support evidence-based programming. Additionally, the Volunteer Generation Fund provides grants to improve the quality and capacity of organizations to work with volunteers, and to create innovations in volunteerism in the areas of recruitment, training, and management.

== Funding the Serve America Act ==
In order to originally implement the Serve America Act, President Barack Obama requested and received approval from Congress for a $1.149 billion for the Corporation. This budget approval marked a huge increase in funding for service in America. Through this increase in funding, existing programs received more money, and the new programs created under the act were able to get off the ground. President Obama requested a $1.4 billion budget for the program.

== Criticism ==
The critics of the Serve America Act argue that by expanding AmeriCorps, the United States government is providing funding to volunteering, something that should be done without compensation. Because AmeriCorps' mission was expanded under the Serve America Act, some feel as though participants do not have similar experiences, and do not feel a sense of connection to the program. The amount of time that AmeriCorps members are required to serve has been reduced, therefore making some question the quality of service these members can provide to the communities they are serving. Critics argue that not enough data exists to support warranting the expansion of national volunteerism through America, and that funding may not be available to have the actions of the bill succeed. They also argue that there might not be enough grantees to provide opportunities to the number of volunteers this bill looks to engage.
