= Global Zero =

Global Zero is a term in the literature of arms control that refers to the worldwide elimination of a weapons system, especially nuclear weapons or a particular class of nuclear weapons. In negotiations over the Intermediate-Range Nuclear Forces Treaty, both sides discussed and eventually agreed to the "global zero option" in delivery vehicles with intermediate range. This option differed from other proposals that would only restrict the use of intermediate-range delivery vehicles in the European theater. The term "global zero" has also been used in connection with de-alerting nuclear weapons and the elimination of tactical nuclear weapons.

The generic term "global zero" or "zero" is often associated with nuclear disarmament or the worldwide elimination of nuclear weapons in arms control discourse. Various arms control campaigns have referred to themselves as Ground Zero or simply as Global Zero.

== See also ==
- Nuclear Weapons: The Road to Zero
- International Campaign to Abolish Nuclear Weapons
- Anti-nuclear organizations
- List of books about nuclear issues
- List of films about nuclear issues
