= The Goldin Institute =

Non-profit organization in Illinois, US

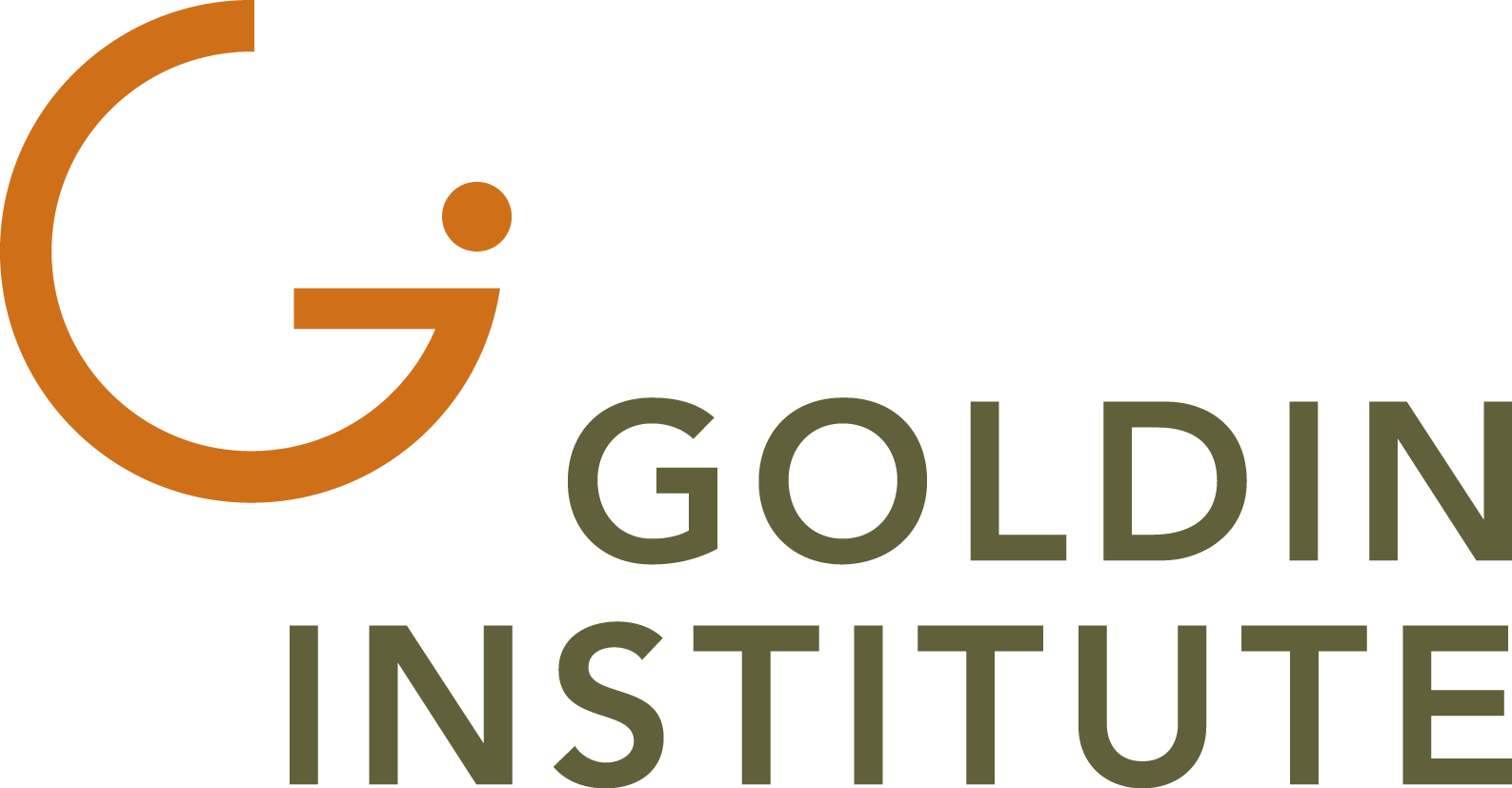
- Formation: 2002
- Type: Non-profit
- Headquarters: Chicago, Illinois
- Key people: Travis Rejman (founding executive director)
- Website: www.goldininstitute.org

The Goldin Institute is a non-profit organization based in Chicago, Illinois, US, that works directly with communities around the globe to create their own strategies and solutions to issues such as poverty alleviation, environmental sustainability, gender empowerment and conflict resolution.

== History ==
The institute was founded in 2002 by Diane Goldin and executive director Travis Rejman, in direct association with The Council for a Parliament of the World's Religions. On October 27, 2002, The Goldin Institute for International Partnership and Peace, a network-forming symposium created to bring together global grassroots leaders in the inter-religious movement, was convened in Chicago, Illinois.

In 2008, the Institute for Food and Development Policy published Goldin's study, "The Limits of Microcredit—A Bangladesh Case". in November 2009, National Public Radio aired a segment on the program Worldview highlighting the Goldin Institute's Improving Microcredit: Listening to Recipients project. In June 2010, the institute organized and facilitated "Listening to the Experiences of Microcredit Recipients" roundtable in Dhaka, Bangladesh. This open dialogue included representatives of microcredit recipients in a discussion with lenders and government regulators. The institute collaborated with Grantmakers Without Borders in creating Microfinance: A Guide For Grantmakers. In this publication, the institute shared its research and experiences from the perspective of recipients of microcredit in Bangladesh. The institute's research brought to light evidence of physical and sexual abuses by loan collectors.

In February 2011, in collaboration with partner organizations, the institute launched the Haiti Camp Security and Sensitization Project in Place Petion, a community within the Champ de Mars camp for displaced persons in Port-au-Prince. In response to the rash of rapes and violence against women and children following the January 2010 earthquake, the institute became directly involved in the project begun by the Institute for Justice & Democracy in Haiti by addressing how Haitian women most vulnerable to assault could organize to stop such violence.

The Goldin Institute works with former child soldiers around the world. In Uganda it helped launch the Youth Leaders for Restoration and Development (YOLRED) the first organization designed and run by former child soldiers. A December 2017 community event hosted by YOLRED included a "talent show" highlighting the work of participants in its art therapy program.

== Collaborators ==
- Institute for Justice & Democracy in Haiti (IJDH)
- Africa Council Religious Leaders
- The Council for a Parliament of the World's Religions
- Nijera Kori
- Grantmakers Without Borders
- Food First
