= New Profit Inc. =

US non-profit organization

New Profit
- Founded: 1998
- Founder: Vanessa Kirsch, Founder-in-Residence and Senior Partner
- Type: Public charity
- Purpose: Venture Philanthropy
- Location: Boston, Massachusetts
- CEO: Tulaine Montgomery
- President: Eliza Greenberg
- Key people: Vanessa Kirsch, Founder-in-Residence and Senior Partner; Doug Borchard, Chief Operating Officer
- Employees: 50+
- Website: newprofit.org

New Profit is a nonprofit social innovation organization and venture philanthropy fund based in Boston, Massachusetts.

== History ==
New Profit was founded in 1998 by social entrepreneur Vanessa Kirsch. After starting and growing two nonprofits—Public Allies and the Women's Information Network—Kirsch took a year to travel the world, interviewing social entrepreneurs and citizens across 22 countries. Through this experience, she came to understand that the nonprofit sector lacks sufficient access to second-stage growth capital, locking social entrepreneurs and their funders into a start-up phase mentality. She determined that in order for social entrepreneurs to have the greatest possible impact, they needed access to financial resources that could allow them to sustain and grow their program models.

In 1996, she began laying the groundwork for a venture philanthropy fund that would provide social entrepreneurs and their organizations with funding and valuable strategic consulting services. After over a year of research and development with a team of social entrepreneurs, academics, and philanthropists, Kirsch and a partner founded New Profit in 1998. With support from Monitor Group and under Kirsch's continued leadership, New Profit has worked with 34 nonprofit organizations to date.

New Profit was based in Cambridge, Massachusetts, from its founding in 1998 until a move to Boston in April 2013.

== Direct support to organizations ==
New Profit provides grants to organizations that address issues in education, workforce development, public health, or poverty alleviation through its portfolio. With funding awarded in July 2010 through the federal Social Innovation Fund, New Profit developed the Pathways Fund, through which it makes grants to organizations that focus on helping disconnected youth ages 18 to 24.

== Action Tank initiatives ==
In 2004, as it began to see program results from its first group of supported nonprofits, New Profit created the Action Tank in an effort to work beyond the organizations it directly funds. The Action Tank has initiatives in three focus areas:

- Federal Policy: Through an initiative called America Forward, a nonpartisan coalition of nearly 50 nonprofit organizations, New Profit seeks to advance a policy agenda and create an infrastructure for social entrepreneurs and government to act together to grow of effective nonprofit organizations.
- Events: Through its annual event, the Gathering of Leaders, New Profit brings together leaders from the public, private, philanthropic, and nonprofit sectors to develop new ideas, relationships, and resources and help build stronger nonprofit organizations.

== Impact ==
New Profit tracks the progress of organizations it funds against five major focus areas—impact and innovation, growth, leadership and governance, organizational strategy, and metrics. To measure this progress, New Profit has developed a Growth Diagnostic Tool that it uses to assess the development of each nonprofit it funds and to then focus additional support where it is most necessary.
