= City Year =

American nonprofit organization

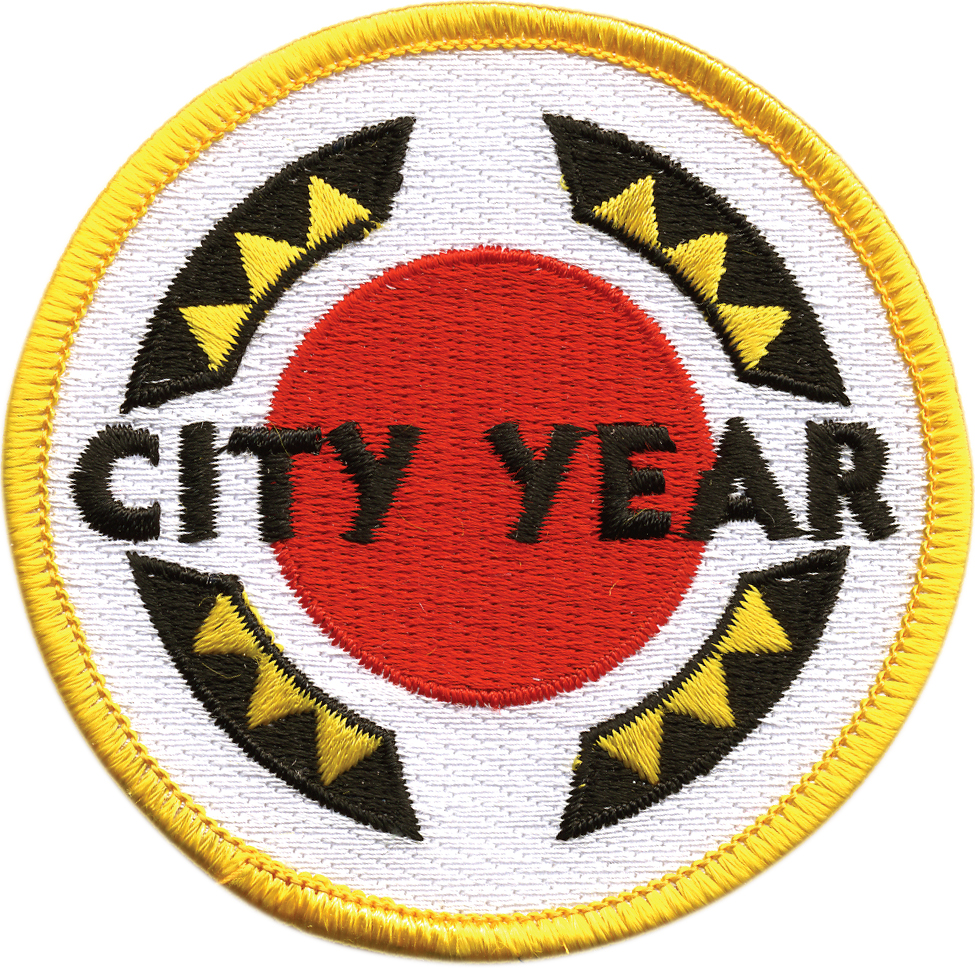
- Founded: 1988
- Founder: Michael Brown and Alan Khazei
- Location: Boston, Massachusetts
- Region served: Baton Rouge Boston; Buffalo; Chicago; Cleveland; Columbia (South Carolina); Columbus (Ohio); Dallas; Denver; Detroit; Jacksonville; Kansas City, Missouri; Little Rock/North Little Rock; Los Angeles; Memphis; Miami; Milwaukee; New Hampshire; New Orleans; New York City; Orlando; Greater Philadelphia; Rhode Island; Sacramento; San Antonio; San Jose/Silicon Valley; Seattle/King County; Tulsa; Washington, D.C. Johannesburg; London, England; Birmingham, England Manchester, England
- Method: citizen service, civic engagement and social entrepreneurship
- Key people: Michael Brown, Cofounder Jim Balfanz, CEO (City Year Boston '94) Charlie Rose, Senior Vice President & Dean
- Revenue: US $147.6 million
- Volunteers: approximately 3,100 Americorps Corps members in 2016
- Website: http://www.cityyear.org
- Revenue numbers are from the 2016 City Year annual report

City Year is an American education nonprofit organization founded in 1988. The organization partners with public schools in 29 high-need communities across the US and through international affiliates in the UK and Johannesburg, South Africa. City Year teams are made up of 18 to 24 year olds, who provide student, classroom, and whole school support, intended to help students stay in school and on track to graduate high school. City Year is a member of the AmeriCorps national service network, and is supported by the Corporation for National and Community Service, school district partnerships, and private philanthropy from corporations, foundations and individuals.

== History ==
City Year was founded in 1988 by Michael Brown and Alan Khazei, then-roommates at Harvard Law School.

City Year AmeriCorps members initially focused their efforts on community rehabilitation, beautification of neighborhoods, and developing community awareness in Boston. Over the years, the organization has expanded, opening sites in 28 cities throughout the US, and refocused its mission to help students in under-served schools reach their full potential and graduate from high school.

Inspired by a visit with City Year during his 1992 presidential campaign, Bill Clinton enlisted the help of Michael Brown, Alan Khazei and others to establish AmeriCorps through the National and Community Service Trust Act of 1993. All AmeriCorps members, originally conceived as unpaid volunteers in service, are now paid a stipend by the federal government through the Corporation for National and Community Service and subsequently through a variety of matching grants, including the Segal AmeriCorps Education Award.

In early 2005, City Year opened its first international site in South Africa. A second international affiliate, City Year London based in London, England, followed in 2010, with City Year Birmingham and City Year Greater Manchester opening in the UK in 2013 and 2015, respectively.

In 2012, City Year announced its Long-Term Impact (LTI) goal to dramatically increase the number of students on track to graduation, reaching the majority of off-track students in each of its communities, and expanding to cities and schools that produce two-thirds of the nation's urban dropouts. Based on national research from Johns Hopkins University and City Year's analysis of existing markets, roughly 15 to 20 percent of schools are producing the majority dropouts within urban school districts.

== Full-time school based service ==
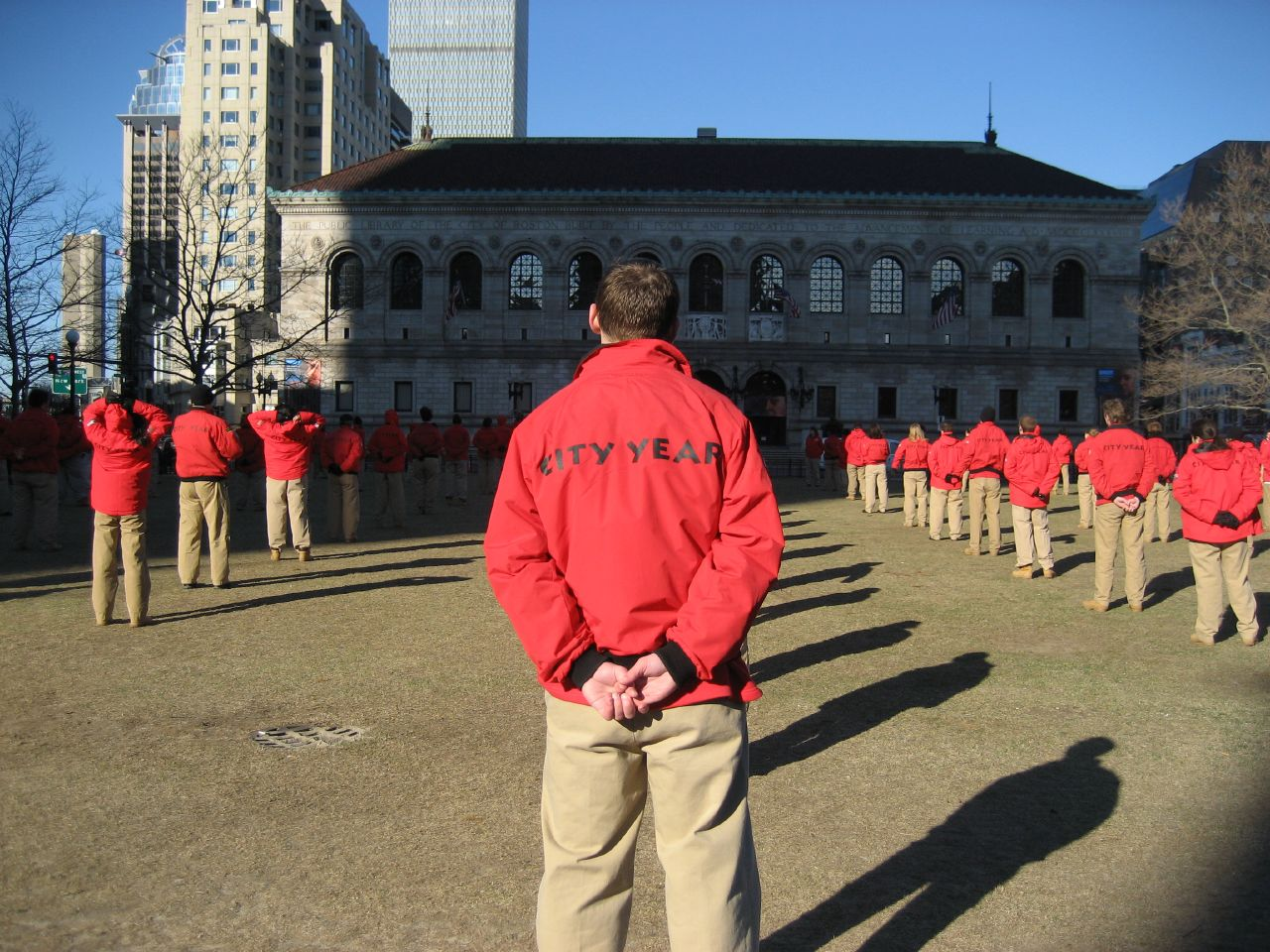
City Year AmeriCorps members in Boston's Copley Square

City Year AmeriCorps members commit to 11 months of service, leadership development and civic engagement, serving as tutors, mentors and role models in high-need schools. It provides extended-day activities: after-school programming, homework assistance, enrichment curricula and civic projects that build and serve communities.

In the 2017–2018 academic year, more than 3,000 City Year AmeriCorps members are serving approximately 223,000 students in 329 schools nationwide.

== Site locations ==
City Year serves in 29 cities within the United States, with two international affiliates.

Location	State/Province	Founding date
Baton Rouge	Louisiana	2005 (Note: City Year Baton Rouge and New Orleans were founded as a single site, City Year Louisiana, in 2005. The sites separated in 2011 forming two separate affiliates.)
Birmingham	England	2013
Boston	Massachusetts	1988
Buffalo	New York	2018
Chicago	Illinois	1994
Cleveland	Ohio	1996
Columbia	South Carolina	1994
Columbus	Ohio	1994
Dallas	Texas	2015
Denver	Colorado	2011
Detroit	Michigan	1999
Jacksonville	Florida	2013
Little Rock	Arkansas	2004
London	England	2010
Los Angeles	California	2007
Manchester	England	2015
Memphis	Tennessee	2016
Miami	Florida	2008
Milwaukee	Wisconsin	2010
Kansas City	Missouri	2015
New Hampshire (Note: The affiliate is named after the state. The site is located in the city of Manchester)	New Hampshire	2000
New Orleans	Louisiana	2005
New York (Note: The affiliate is centered around New York City not state.)	New York	2003
Orlando	Florida	2013
Greater Philadelphia	Pennsylvania	1997
Providence	Rhode Island	1993
Sacramento	California	2012
San Antonio	Texas	1995
San Jose/Silicon Valley	California	1994
Seattle/King County	Washington	1998
South Africa (Note: The affiliate is named after the country it is located in. The site is located in the city of Johannesburg)	Gauteng	2005
Tulsa	Oklahoma	2013
Washington, D.C.	Washington, D.C.	2000

^{*Highlighted entries are international locations}

== Corps ==
Approximately 80% of corps members are recent college graduates, 56% are people of color, 48% are Pell Grant eligible, 42% are fluent or conversational in a second language and 25% are first generation college students.

AmeriCorps members begin their service year in the summertime, undergoing several weeks of intensive training before the beginning of the school year. During this training, corps members are oriented to City Year culture and trained on how to work within schools. They are assigned to serve in a team at a particular school, where they will work for the duration of their service year.

Like other AmeriCorps members, City Year corps members receive a biweekly living allowance, or modest stipend. City Year AmeriCorps also receive health insurance benefits and qualify for a post-service Segal Education Award through AmeriCorps. Additionally, City Year has local partnerships in all cities that offer benefits such as public transit passes and discounts to local businesses just for City Year AmeriCorps members.

== United States funding ==
City Year's funding comes from a variety of sources. In 2017, 23% of the organization's operating revenue came from AmeriCorps, 54% from corporations, foundations and individual donors, and 23% from school districts and other local government grants.

== Schools ==
Public school districts partner with City Year to bring teams of AmeriCorps member to work in schools. Though it varies from district to district, schools are responsible for financing a portion of the cost of maintaining a team of City Year AmeriCorps members in service.

== Care Force ==
Care Force is a part of City Year specifically created to engage corporations and their employees in high-impact volunteer events to help improve schools and communities.

Since launching in 2001, Care Force has led more than 100,000 volunteers in service projects and managed more than 700 events, and worked in over 220 communities in 10 countries over three continents.

== Awards ==
City Year is a five-time winner of the Social Capitalist award from the Fast Company Monitor group. City Year has received positive reviews from the Princeton Review and the U.S. News & World Report, and has earned four stars from the organization, Charity Navigator. City Year was also named to the Philanthropy 400, an annual ranking of America's nonprofits based on the contributions they raise from individuals, foundations, and corporations by the Chronicle of Philanthropy, in 2015 and 2016.

== Criticism ==
City Year has been criticized, as of 2019, for paying volunteers a stipend below the poverty line while requiring them to work upwards of 50 hour work weeks.

They have also been criticized for accepting a sponsorship from PepsiCo in light of rising rates of childhood obesity.

== City Year South Africa ==
In 2001 at a conference on civil society in Cape Town, US President Bill Clinton brought a delegation of City Year Service Leaders and staff from Boston, to meet with South African President Nelson Mandela. Mandela was eager to implement a programme in South Africa that afforded young people the opportunity to serve their communities. He loved the idea of City Year and after further conversations; City Year's first international site was launched in 2005 with 110 Service Leaders in Johannesburg.

City Year brings together a diverse group of young people for a year of voluntary service and leadership development. These young people work in teams as tutors, mentors and role models to children in 10 primary schools throughout Johannesburg and Soweto. City Year South Africa works to support the growing National Youth Service movement, with a strong belief that youth service is a powerful vehicle for developing a generation of young leaders for South Africa, promoting a culture of service across all sectors of society, addressing critical development needs in schools and communities, and addressing youth unemployment.

City Year South Africa provides a year of full-time community service, leadership development and skills training to young South African volunteers (Service Leaders).

Since its inception in 2005 City Year South Africa has graduated over 1,200 Service Leaders who engaged over 20,000 children through after-school programs and various other projects. In total these Service Leaders have completed over 1 million hours of service.

== City Year London ==
City Year launched in London during the 2010/11 academic year with 60 corps members working in teams across six primary schools. For the start of the 2011/12 school year, City Year had 81 corps members serving across nine schools.

Since the 2010 general election, City Year London has met with range of Members of Parliament, government ministers, and Prime Minister David Cameron to champion service opportunities for young people across the UK.

In 2012 City Year London was awarded a Social Action Fund grant of £300,000 by the Government's Cabinet Office, which has gone towards the expansion of City Year's service across London and the development of three new school partnerships from September 2012.

=== Leadership development ===
Leadership development days include CV and interview guidance, work-shadowing, networking sessions, public speaking and presentation skills training. Each corps member is also matched with a corporate mentor. 95% of corps members who graduated from the 2011/12 City Year London programme successfully secured a place in education or employment after City Year.

=== IVR evaluation ===
An evaluation of City Year London's work in schools was conducted by the Institute for Volunteering Research in November 2012. It found that corps members were having a positive effect on the attainment, behaviour and focus of school children and that teachers valued the help and support they received from corps members in the classroom. The evaluation also highlighted a boost in confidence and the employability of City Year corps members who have completed the programme.

=== The London Corps ===
Approximately 60% of City Year London's current corps members are graduates while 40% are college leavers.

==== Private Equity Foundation ====
The Private Equity Foundation helped to bring City Year from America to London in 2010. The Chief Executive of the Private Equity Foundation, Shaks Ghosh, visited City Year in Boston in 2009 and was so impressed by its 'double benefit' model that she donated £1 million to help start up City Year in London. The Private Equity Foundation is City Year London's Lead Founding Partner.

== See also ==
- National Civilian Community Corps
- Peace Corps
- Teach For America
