= Clutch (disambiguation) =

A clutch is a mechanical device which provides for the transmission of power from one component to another.

Clutch may also refer to:

== Automotive ==
- In the automotive sense, clutch may be slang for a manual transmission
- Or, it may be short for the clutch pedal used to operate a manual transmission vehicle

== Music ==
- Clutch (band), a musical group from Frederick, Maryland
  - Clutch (Clutch album), 1995
- The Clutch, an American collective of songwriters
- Clutch (Peter Hammill album), 2002
- "Clutch", a song by Ken Carson from the 2021 album Project X
- Clutch, the part of a hi-hat stand that holds the upper cymbal of a drum kit

== Periodicals ==
- Clutch (magazine), a digital magazine
- Clutch (literary magazine), a defunct small press literary magazine

== Sports ==
- Clutch (mascot), the mascot of the Houston Rockets basketball team
- Maple, Zayu and Clutch, mascots of the 2026 FIFA World Cup
- Clutch, a mascot of the Tohoku Rakuten Golden Eagles baseball team
- Clutch (sports), a term referring to the ability to perform under pressure
  - Clutch hitter, referring to baseball

== Other uses ==
- Clutch (eggs), a collection of eggs in a single nest
- Clutch (handbag), a purse designed to be carried (clutched) in one's hand
- Butterfly clutch, also known as a Ballou clutch or dammit, a device used to secure pins
- Clutch (G.I. Joe), a fictional character in the G.I. Joe universe
- Clutch (video game), a 2027 racing game
- Clutch (web series), a Canadian crime/thriller web series created by Jonathan Robbins
- Mr. Clutch, a nickname

== See also ==
- Double clutch (disambiguation)
- Clutched, a digital media company
