= Jean Case =

American businesswoman (born 1959)

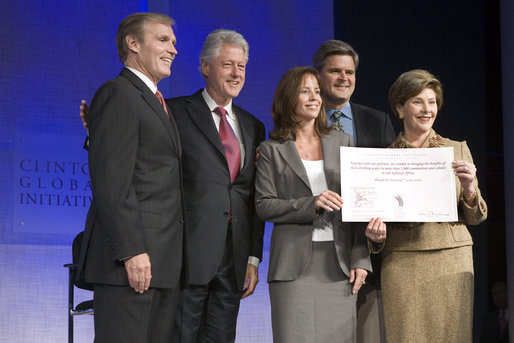
- Laura Bush announces a $60 million partnership between the U.S. Government and the Case Foundation at the Clinton Global Initiative conference in New York on September 20, 2006

Chair of the National Geographic Society
- Incumbent
- Assumed office February 2016
- Preceded by: John Fahey

Personal details
- Born: 1959 (age 66–67) Bloomington, Illinois, U.S.
- Spouse: Steve Case (m. 1998)
- Education: Westminster Academy
- Occupation: CEO, Case Foundation; Chair, National Geographic
- Website: CaseFoundation.org

Jean Case (previously Villanueva and Wackes, born 1959) is an American businesswoman, author, and philanthropist who is CEO of Case Impact Network, and CEO of the Case Foundation.. She was chairman of National Geographic from 2016-2025. She is married to AOL co-founder Steve Case.

== Early life ==
Case was born in Bloomington, Illinois and raised in Normal, Illinois before moving to Florida. She attended high school at the Westminster Academy in Fort Lauderdale, graduating in 1978.

== Career ==
=== Early career ===
Case began her career as the marketing manager with online information services Source Telecomputing Corporation (The Source) and joining a General Electric “team trying to drive disruptive innovation within a big company” at General Electric Information Services (GEnie). Case then joined America Online (AOL) when it was a small startup and was at the table as it grew into the company that provided Internet services to about half of all U.S. homes with Internet access, worked as director of marketing, vice president for marketing, and vice president for corporate communications. She left AOL in 1996.

She and her husband created the Case Foundation in 1997 and they joined the Giving Pledge in 2011, committing to give away a majority of their wealth.

In June 2006, Case was appointed by President George W. Bush to chair the President's Council on Service and Civic Participation.

In 2007, Case was asked by U.S. Secretary of State Condoleezza Rice to serve as a co-chair of the U.S.-Palestinian Partnership to promote economic opportunities for the Palestinian people, prepare Palestinian youth for the responsibilities of citizenship and good governance, and marshal new private investment in the West Bank.

In 2016, Case gave a TedxMidAtlantic talk, where she highlighted the importance innovators have played in the history of the United States and examined modern entrepreneurship.

In 2018, in reference to the under-representation of woman-founded and African-American-founded companies as recipients of venture capital, Case stated, "One thing we know for sure is talent is evenly distributed. Opportunity is not."

In 2021, she advocated for making it easier for inexperienced investors to make stock market bets.

=== Board membership ===
Case was Chairman of the National Geographic Society's board of trustees from February 2016 through December 2025, and was the first woman to hold the position. She is on the boards of the White House Historical Association, and the Smithsonian American Women's History Museum. Past board and advisory council leadership positions include the Stanford Center on Philanthropy and the Civil Society, Georgetown University's Beeck Center for Social Impact & Innovation, and the Brain Trust Accelerator Fund as well as the Harvard Business School Social Enterprise Initiative, the President's Council on Service and Civic Participation, and Malaria No More.

=== Investments ===
Case has long been a "leader in impact investing" and was a cofounder of The ImPact, a membership network of family enterprises (family offices, foundations, and businesses) that are committed to making investments with measurable social impact and was a member of the U.S. NAB to the G7 Task Force on Impact Investing.

Case has been profiled for her impact investments by The New York Times, Financial Times, and Bloomberg News. Jean and Steve Case have personally invested in and leveraged new online platforms for social good, such as Network for Good, Causes, and MissionFish. In 2011, she opened Early Mountain Vineyards, a 300-acre property in Madison, Virginia, whose wines have won awards from Decanter, Wine Enthusiast and USA Today.

== Awards and recognition ==
Jean and Steve Case were named by Barron's as one of the "25 Best Givers" in 2011 and one of the "9 Most Generous Tech Entrepreneurs" by Fast Company in 2013. They received the Woodrow Wilson Award for Corporate Citizenship in 2001. The award was given out by the Woodrow Wilson International Center for Scholars of the Smithsonian Institution in Washington, D.C. Jean and Steve Case were honored with the Lifetime of Idealism Award by City Year in 2009 and honored as Citizens of the Year by the National Conference on Citizenship in 2011

Case was named the Washington Business Journal's Corporate Philanthropist of the Year in 2011. In 2013 she received the Excellence in Entrepreneurship Award from Wake Forest University and was a finalist for the Washington Business Journal's "Most Admired Nonprofit CEO." That same year she as a mentor for the Wall Street Journal's "Startup of the Year."

In 2014, Case received an honorary Doctor of Humane Letters degree from Indiana University Lilly Family School of Philanthropy for her philanthropic work, and in 2015 she received an honorary Doctor of Humane Letters from George Mason University.

In 2016, Case was elected to the American Academy of Arts and Sciences.

In 2020, the National Venture Capital Association (NVCA) presented Case, and her husband Steve, with the 2020 American Spirit Award recognizing their philanthropic leadership and outstanding contribution to society.

In 2023, Jean Case was the commencement speaker at the Virginia Tech graduation in Blacksburg, Virginia.

== Personal life ==
While Case was working at AOL, she divorced her first husband and started a relationship with Steve Case. She and Steve married in 1998 in a ceremony officiated by Billy Graham. They previously resided in McLean, Virginia, in a mansion that was the childhood home of Jacqueline Bouvier, which they sold in 2018.

== Publications ==
- Case, Jean; Be Fearless: 5 Principles for a Life of Breakthroughs and Purpose ISBN 978-1501196348
