= Badge =

Physical or digital insignia indicating membership, rank or accomplishment

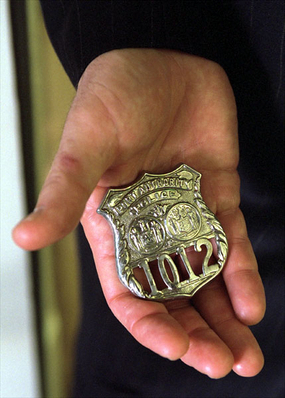
Port Authority of New York and New Jersey Police Department badge

A badge is a device or accessory, often containing the insignia of an organization, which is presented or displayed to indicate some feat of service, a special accomplishment, a symbol of authority granted by taking an oath (e.g., police and fire), a sign of legitimate employment or student status, or as a simple means of identification. They are also used in advertising, publicity, and for branding purposes.

Badges can be made from metal, plastic, leather, textile, rubber, etc., and they are commonly attached to clothing, bags, footwear, vehicles, home electrical equipment, etc. Textile badges or patches can be either woven or embroidered, and can be attached by gluing, ironing-on, sewing or applique.

Badges have become highly collectable: in the UK, for example, the Badge Collectors' Circle has been in existence since 1980.

In the military, badges are used to denote the unit or arm to which the wearer belongs, and also qualifications received through military training, rank, etc. Similarly, youth organizations such as scouting and guiding use them to show group membership, awards and rank.

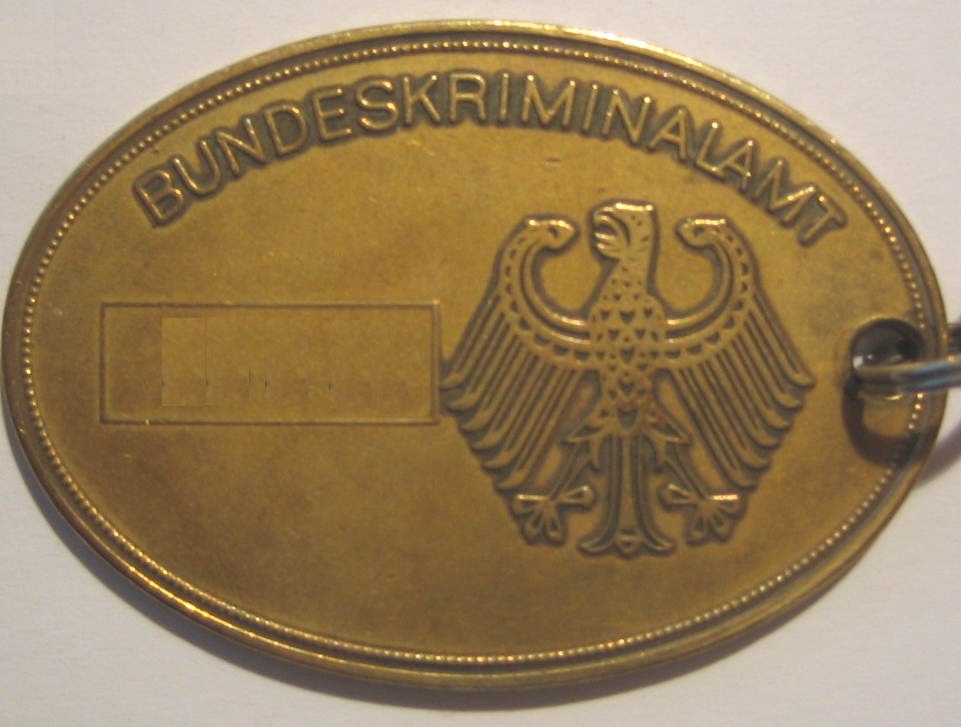
Badge of the German Bundeskriminalamt

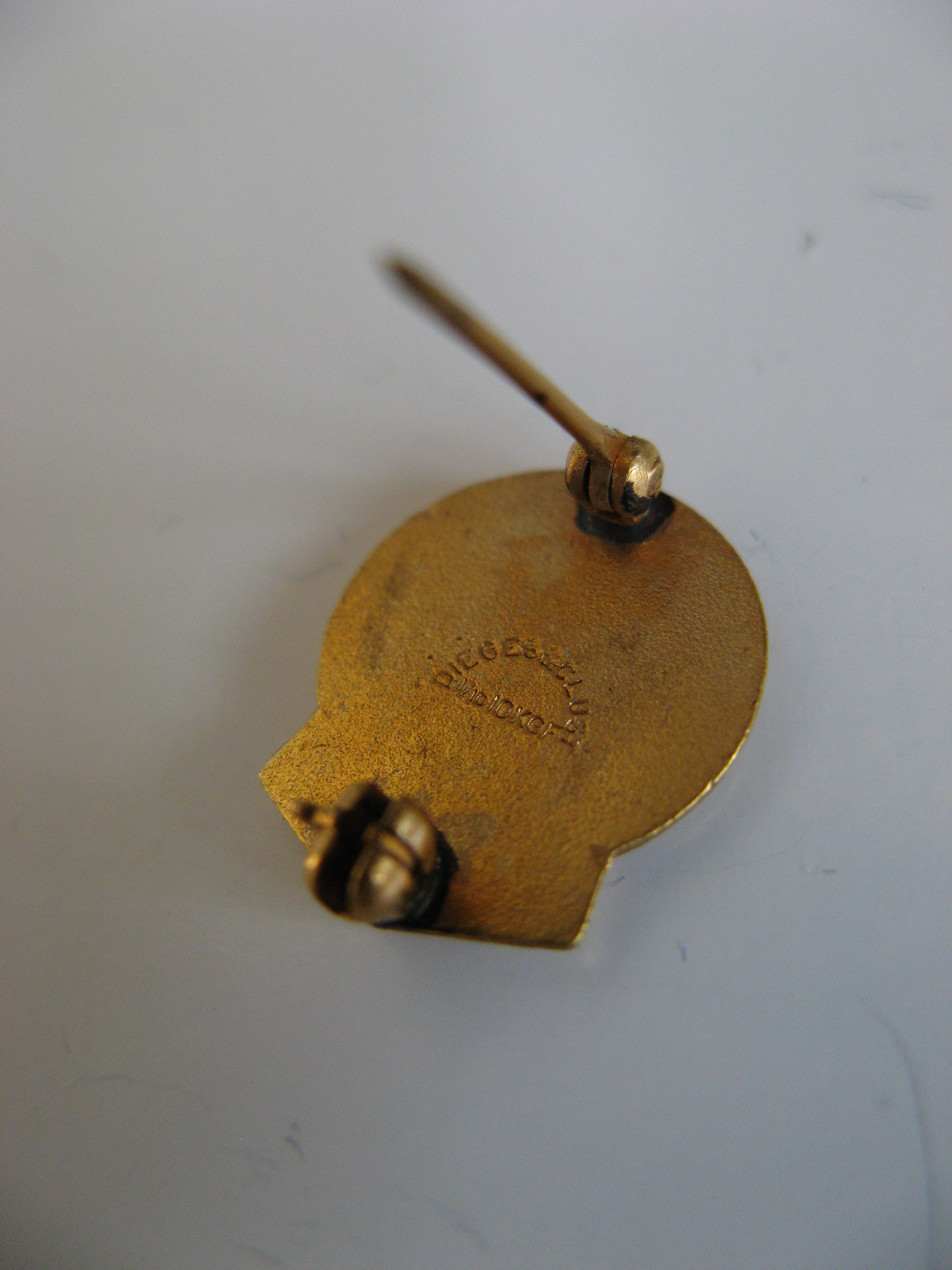
Back of a badge, with safety pin attachment

== History ==
Badges were as popular as jewellery in the Middle Ages, and varied from extremely expensive works of jewellery, like the Dunstable Swan Jewel, to simple mold-made badges in lead or other base metals. Specialized forms were the pilgrim badge, worn by those who had completed a pilgrimage, and heraldic or livery badges, worn to denote service or allegiance to a political figure — these last were especially popular in England, and became very controversial in the period leading up to the Wars of the Roses. One royal celebration in 1483 was marked by the distribution of 13,000 badges, a huge number relative to the population at the time. Other types were funerary badges, presumably presented to mourners for the funeral of important figures, and simple decorative badges with animals or hearts. The grandest form of badge was worn as a pendant to a metal collar, often in gold or silver-gilt.

From the livery badge, various badges of service evolved, worn by officials, soldiers and servants. In the British Army a metal (today often plastic) cap badge denoting the soldier's regiment became standard by the 17th century, as in most European armies (though not always navies). By the 19th century a badge was an almost invariable part of any uniform, including school uniforms, which in the UK usually still feature the school's badge in cloth on the breast pocket of the jacket or blazer.

== Various uses ==
One of the best-known badges is the typically star-shaped U.S. sheriff's badge, made famous in Westerns. The Chairman Mao badge is probably the most famous political badge. Members of fraternities and sororities often refer to the pins that signify their membership as badges.

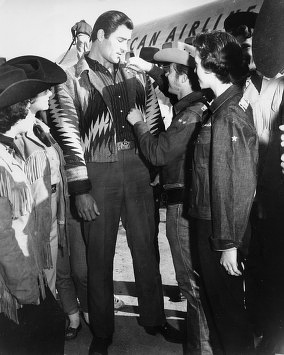
Badge pinning

The BBC children's programme Blue Peter also awards its own "Blue Peter badge" to members of the public who appear on the show. These are highly collectable as they cannot be bought—except from people who have been awarded one and wish to sell it.

Case badges are thick, about 3 mm (0.12 in) deep, 3-by-3-centimetre (1.2 in × 1.2 in) lucite stickers that are often packaged with various computer parts, such as processors and video cards. Modern computer cases are frequently embellished with an indentation on the case's front panel to facilitate the affixing of a case badge.

Button badges are a highly collectible round badge with a plastic coating over a design or image. They often have a metal pin back or a safety pin style back. The most popular size is 25.4-millimetre (1.00 in) but the badges can range anywhere from this size right up to 120-millimetre (4.7 in) badges. This style of badge is used in political campaigning and often given as part of a birthday greeting such as a birthday card.

In the United States, the badges used by law enforcement, fire, and security guards are usually made of metal in various colors and finishes and are worn above the left chest pocket on the uniform shirt or jacket. Detectives and other plainclothes personnel may wear them on a belt holder, or on a chain around the neck. Shapes are manifold, with municipal police departments tending to have some variation of a shield shape, and sheriff's departments usually going with a 5, 6, or 7 point star shape. In most cases, an enameled seal of the organization, city, county, or company can be found in the center of the badge.

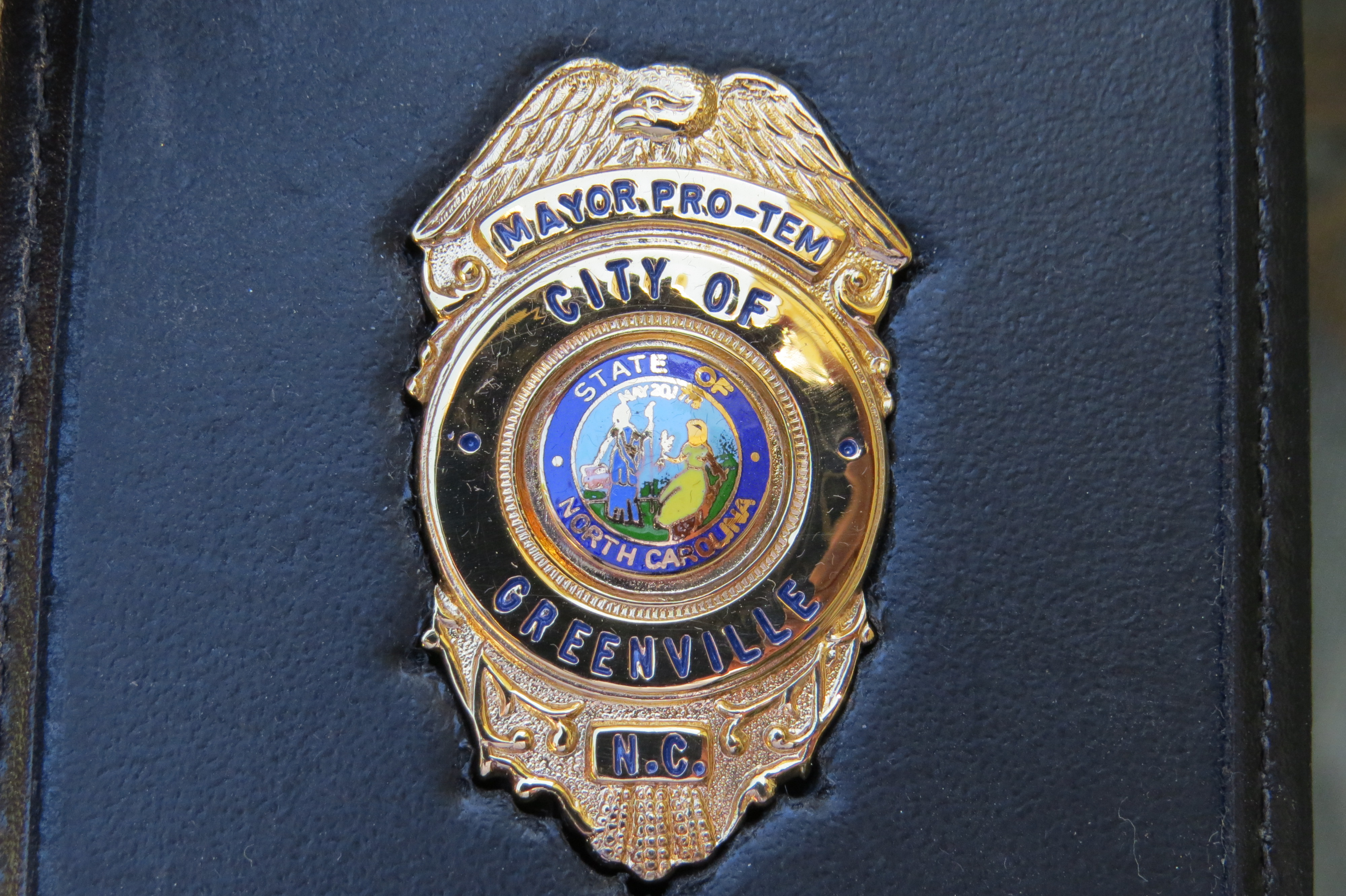
Police Badge, Greenville, North Carolina, presented to the Mayor, William J. Hadden

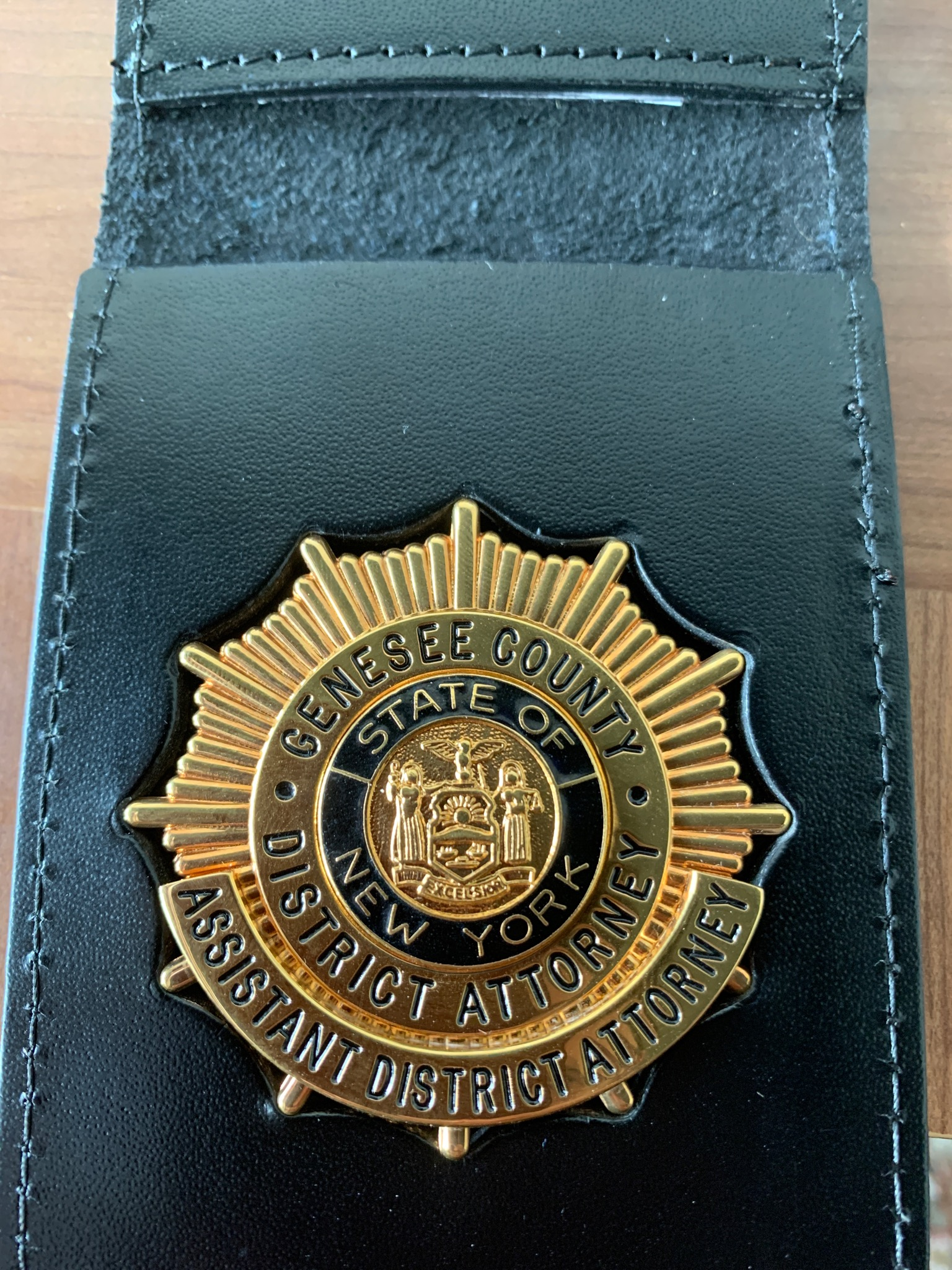
The badge of an Assistant District Attorney in Genesee County, NY.

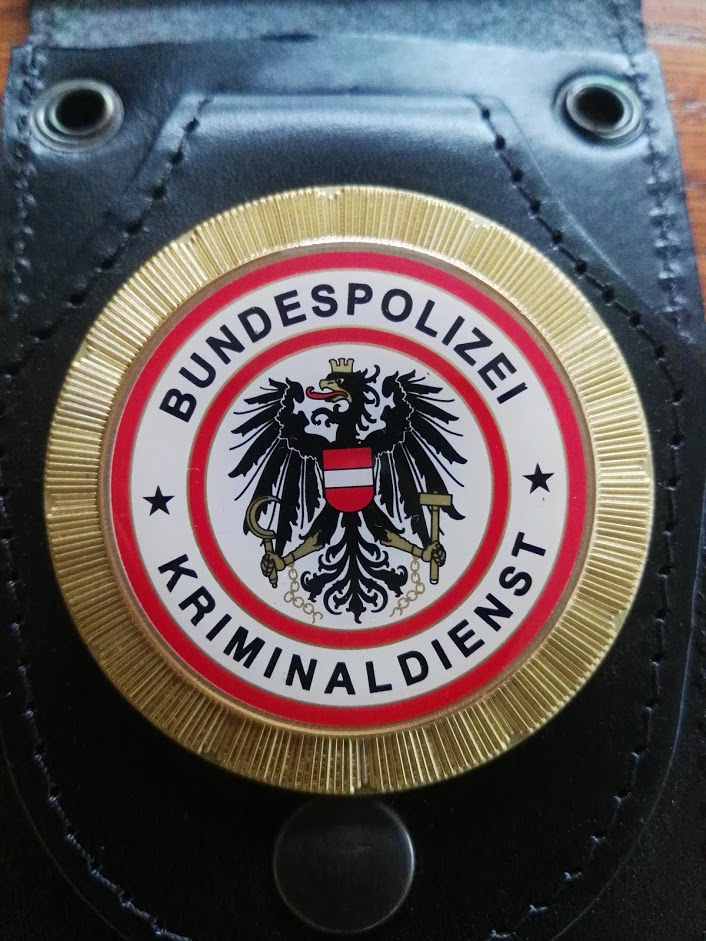
Detective's badge of Austrian police.

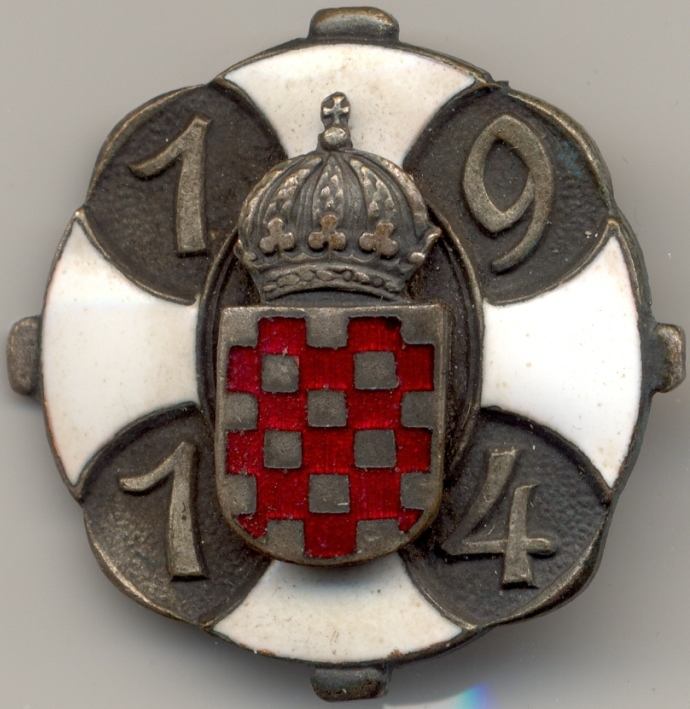
Patriotic badge (Croatia, 1914)

In computing, badges are used to demonstrate skills. In education, digital badges are used as alternative forms of credentials, similar to those being used in the MacArthur Foundation's Badges for Lifelong Learning initiative.

In Japan, lawyers are often issued lapel pin badges which serve as an identification tool in court, or during their normal course of work. Since lawyers are vested with special powers by law, such as the power to compel government agencies to provide information, these badges provide a quick way for lawyers to identify themselves as such.

== Bibliography ==
- Attwood, Philip, Badges. London: British Museum Press, 2004.
- Attwood, Philip, Acquisitions of badges (1978-1982). London : British Museum Occasional Paper 55, 1985.
- Attwood, Philip, Acquisition of badges (1983-1987). London: British Museum Occasional Paper 76, 1990.
- Bible, Don. Warrant Discs of the Gestapo & Kripo, 1934-1946. Morristown, Tenn: Published privately by the author, 1991.
- C.G. Braxmar Co., Inc. (New York, N.Y.). Illustrated Catalogue of Fire & Police Dept. Badges. New York: The company, 1921.
- Dinnes, Andrew Ross. Border War Badges: A Guide to South African Military & Police Badges, 1964-1994. 2011.
- Houser, Todd R., Norm Sorenson, and Ronald L. Myers. A History of the City of Long Beach, California Police Badge. [Long Beach, Calif.]: Long Beach Police Historical Society, 2005.
- Mauldin, William. State Police & State Highway Patrol Badge Guide. Meadows of Dan, Va: William Mauldin Productions, 1999.
- Taylor, Michael Bradley, and Victor Legender Wilkinson. Badges of Office: An Illustrated Guide to the Helmets and Badges of the British Police 1829 to 1989. Henley-on-Thames: Hazell, 1989.

== See also ==
- Badge of honor
- Badge of shame
- Builder's plate
- Campaign button
- Charity badge
- Debadging
- Diadem
- Heraldic badge
- Identification badge
- Lapel pin
- Military badges of the United States
- Name plate
- Name tag
- Nursing pin
- Police memorabilia collecting
- Scout badge
- Stinking badges
- Web badge
