= Dima Ghawi =

American author and speaker

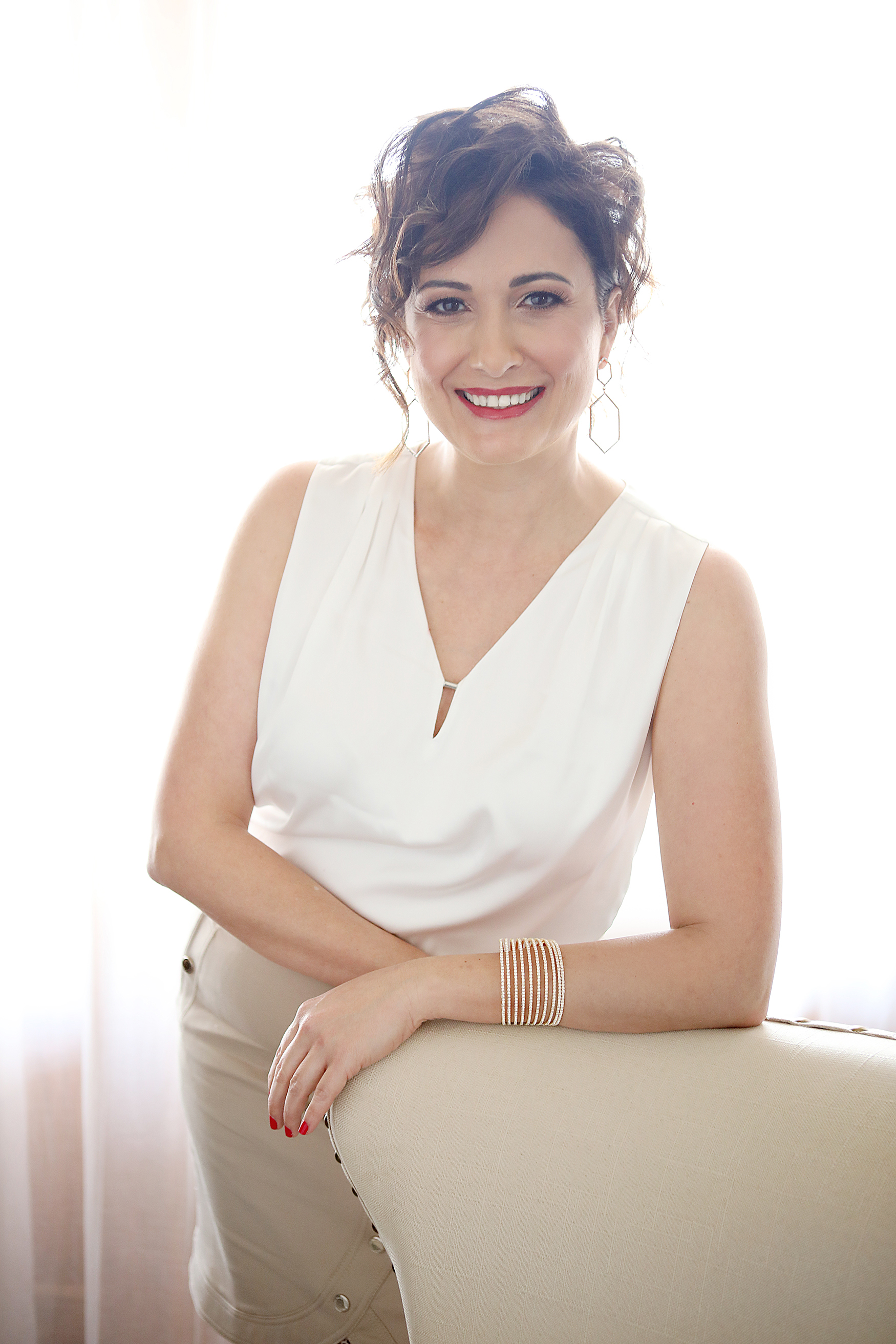
- Born: Dima Ghawi; July 18, 1975 (age 51); Ankara, Turkey
- Education: MBA from the University of San Diego; BA in Economics from San Diego State University
- Occupations: Motivational Keynote Speaker, Leadership Consultant, and Author
- Writing career
- Notable work: Breaking Vases: Shattering Limitations & Daring to Thrive - A Middle Eastern Woman's Story
- Website: www.dimaghawi.com

Dima Ghawi (born July 18, 1975) is a Jordanian American award-winning author, leadership keynote speaker, and executive coach. She is the founder of Dima Ghawi, LLC., and the author of Breaking Vases: Shattering Limitations & Daring to Thrive - A Middle Eastern Woman’s Story (2018).

== Early life and education ==
Ghawi was born in Ankara, Turkey, raised in Amman, Jordan, and immigrated to San Diego, California in 1996. She grew up surrounded by Middle Eastern culture and values which heavily influenced her early choices.

In Amman, Ghawi attended the University of Jordan for two years. After moving to the United States, she transferred to San Diego State University, where she completed a BA in Economics in 1999. Ghawi graduated from the University of San Diego with an MBA in 2004.

== Career ==
=== Corporate ===
Ghawi began her corporate career of two decades at Merrill Lynch as a part of a financial planning team between completing her Economics degree and MBA. Upon receiving her MBA, she was chosen for a selective leadership development program with IBM, including an international assignment in Japan from 2008 to 2009. In 2013, Ghawi moved to Baton Rouge, Louisiana to work as the talent development manager at IBM’s Technology Development Center.

In 2015, Ghawi left IBM to pursue an independent entrepreneurship career in public speaking and leadership development.

=== Public speaking ===
A three-time TEDx speaker, Ghawi is best known for her keynote presentation on Breaking Vases, inspired by her life story. She shared a version of this speech for the first time on the TEDxLSU stage in 2014. In this presentation, Ghawi employs her story of escaping confinements, shattering barriers, crossing continents to empower others to dare to discover and create bold identities and transformational life purposes.

Ghawi is also known for presenting on topics related to diversity, equity, and inclusion, such as unconscious bias and creating an inclusive work culture. As of 2023, Ghawi has also been presenting The Misfit Advantage^{SM}, a keynote designed to encourage audiences to embrace and employ their differences in personal and professional settings.

As a speaker, Ghawi is commonly applauded for her use of personal narratives as well as her use of props, including the signature glass vase smashed in her Breaking Vases presentations.

=== Coaching ===
Following her departure from IBM in 2015, Ghawi founded Dima Ghawi, LLC., a global talent development company that offers workshops and coaching with the primary mission of advancing individuals in leadership.

In 2018, Ghawi founded Leadership & Lattes, a women’s empowerment community where participants gather in person and virtually to support one another in networking and professional development. In 2026, Ghawi founded Rise Beyond, a global leadership community that offers monthly online webinars and a future-ready leadership toolkit to support professional development for members across different industries, backgrounds, and countries.

=== Writing ===
Ghawi is an international best-selling author of her memoir, Breaking Vases: Shattering Limitations & Daring to Thrive - A Middle Eastern Woman’s Story. The memoir follows Ghawi’s life from her childhood in Amman to moving to San Diego to her TEDxLSU speech, exploring how she escaped from an abusive father and a controlling husband. Major themes in the memoir include resilience, perseverance, and self-discovery. Breaking Vases has been described as an “intriguing page-turner” and received praise for its insight into the ways both women and men can be constrained by certain Middle Eastern cultural norms.

Shortly after publication, Breaking Vases was recognized as the 2018 Writer’s Digest Grand Prize Winner, among other awards.

Ghawi has also published three personal essays related to her experiences growing up in the Middle East and leadership adventures had in Japan and traveling to Bulgaria while working as an operations manager with IBM.

=== Interviews ===
Ghawi has been interviewed across multiple topics related to her leadership expertise, including creating a sense of inclusion in the workplace; uncovering and managing unconscious bias; bridging generational divides in the workplace; and creating a personal brand. Ghawi has also been interviewed numerous times about her personal story, particularly in the wake of the publication of Breaking Vases.

== Books and personal essays ==
- Ghawi, Dima (2018). Breaking Vases: Shattering Limitations & Daring to Thrive - A Middle Eastern Woman’s Story. Dima Ghawi, LLC. p. 232. ISBN 978-0-9978093-5-0.
- Ghawi, Dima (2022). “Destination Sofia: Lessons in Leadership & Travel.” Dima Ghawi, LLC. p. 23. ASIN B0B5S1Q124.
- Ghawi, Dima (2017). “How NOT to Lead a Team Climbing a Volcano: An Adventure in Leadership and a Near-Death Experience.” Dima Ghawi, LLC. p. 25. ASIN B07483ZS52
- Ghawi, Dima (2016). “The Wild Element: It Is Time To Rise.” Dima Ghawi, LLC. p. 22. ASIN B01IEFX8LU

== Selected publications ==
- Ghawi, Dima (2024). “Knowledge Is Light.” HR Professionals Magazine.

== Honors and awards ==
Ghawi has been recognized for her services with the 2014 President’s Volunteer Service Award (Bronze), the 2023 American Advertising Federation Baton Rouge Mosaic Champion Award, the 2021 International Women’s Entrepreneurial Challenge Award, the 2019 Baton Rouge Business Report “Influential Women in Business” Award, the 2014 Baton Rouge Business Report’s “Forty Under 40” Award, and the 2016 Louisiana State University “Esprit de Femme Award.”
