= President's Council on Service and Civic Participation =

The President's Council on Service and Civic Participation was created by U.S. President George W. Bush in January 2003 by executive order. Its mission is to encourage volunteerism and to recognize the contributions Americans make through service and civic participation.

In January 2002, President George W. Bush called upon all Americans to give two years or 4,000 hours of their lives to service. The Council was created to further this goal, encouraging Americans of all ages and backgrounds to become more engaged in civic activities. Council members provide leadership, serving as "Ambassadors of Service" for the President's vision of fostering a culture of citizenship and volunteer service in the United States.

The Council brings together leaders from the worlds of business, entertainment, sports, education, government, nonprofits, and the media. The council was made up of the following individuals:

- Stephen Baldwin
- Jean Case, Chair
- Ray Chambers
- Jerry Colangelo
- Evern Cooper Epps
- Myrka Dellanos
- Hilary Duff
- Tony Dungy
- Sara Evans
- Angela Baraquio Grey
- Patricia Heaton
- Kasey Kahne
- Art Linkletter (deceased)
- Mary Jo Myers
- Michelle Nunn
- Kelly Perdew
- Cokie Roberts (deceased)
- Michael W. Smith, Vice Chair
- Wendy Spencer
- Roxanne Spillet (deceased)
- Hope Taft
- Janine Turner
- Charles "Chuck" Turlinski (deceased)
- Danny Wuerffel
- Mark Yudof

The Council is administered by the Corporation For National and Community Service, with members from business, entertainment, sports, education, government, nonprofits, and the media. The chair of the Council is Jean Case, CEO of the Case Foundation, and the vice chair is musician Michael W. Smith.

The Council created the President's Volunteer Service Award to recognize outstanding volunteers. Since 2003, more than 700,000 people have won the award.

President Bush amended the executive order in January 2007 to extend the Council through November 2008.
