= Double clutch =

Double clutch or double-clutch may refer to:

- Double clutch, a baseball term for a fielder drawing his arm back twice before throwing
- Double-clutching (technique), a method of driving that involves pressing and releasing the clutch twice per shift
- Double-clutching (zoology), when an oviparous animal lays two sets of viable eggs in one season

== Entertainment ==
- Double Clutch (Transformers), a fictional character in the Transformers franchise
- Double Clutch (album), an album by Andrew Cyrille and Richard Teitelbaum; recorded in 1981, released in 1997
- Double Clutch (video game), a Sega Mega Drive game released in 1993

== See also ==
- Dual-clutch transmission, a type of transmission that has two separate clutches
- Clutch (disambiguation)
