= OTAA =

Australian menswear accessories brand

- Industry: Fashion, Menswear
- Founded: 2011; 15 years ago
- Founders: Shaheen Haroon, Fameez Haroon
- Headquarters: Melbourne, Victoria, Australia
- Website: otaa.com

OTAA is an Australian menswear and accessories brand, founded in Melbourne in 2011.

== History ==
OTAA is an Australian menswear brand founded in Melbourne in 2011 by brothers Shaheen Haroon and Fameez Haroon. The company was created to challenge the traditional approach of the menswear industry, which the founders viewed as "serious" and "brooding". Initially operating from a garage with an investment of $500, OTAA differentiated itself through a brand identity that incorporated humor and eccentricity in its marketing.

The company name, OTAA, stands for "Ocean Ties Apparel Australia," and it uses recycled ocean plastic in some of its textiles. It operates on a direct-to-consumer model and engages with customers through social media.

== Products and operations ==
The company initially sold neckties. As of 2025, its inventory had expanded to include bow ties, lapel pins, pocket squares and wrinkle-free dress shirts, comprising over 10,000 stock keeping units.

In 2025, the brand expanded into apparel with its "Non-Iron" shirt range. The collection was named a finalist for the Design Excellence Award at the Ragtrader Australian Fashion Industry Awards.

Product designs are developed in-house in Melbourne. Sales are handled via the company's website and social media platforms.

OTAA products have been worn publicly by figures including Robert F. Kennedy Jr., Angus Taylor and Peter Malinauskas. Its products have also appeared in the television series Better Call Saul, The Bear and the film Elvis.

== Marketing and growth ==
OTAA's growth stems from its distinctive brand strategy focused on social media and viral customer engagement. By 2025, it served over 400,000 customers, generated revenue without external funding. The brand has gained international visibility, with business reporting stating its products have been worn in the White House and by Hollywood actors, as well as being parodied on Saturday Night Live. They have worked with Instagram influencers for advertising.

In 2025, the brand was named a winner in the Challenger Brands category of the Inc. Best in Business awards. It also received a Silver Asia eCommerce Award. In 2025, the brand was a finalist in the Glossy Fashion & Luxury Awards for Best Launch Campaign and was shortlisted for Pureplay of the Year and Best Marketing Campaign at the Drapers Awards in the UK, recognizing its Shirts From the Future campaign.
