= John M. Fahey Jr. =

John Fahey
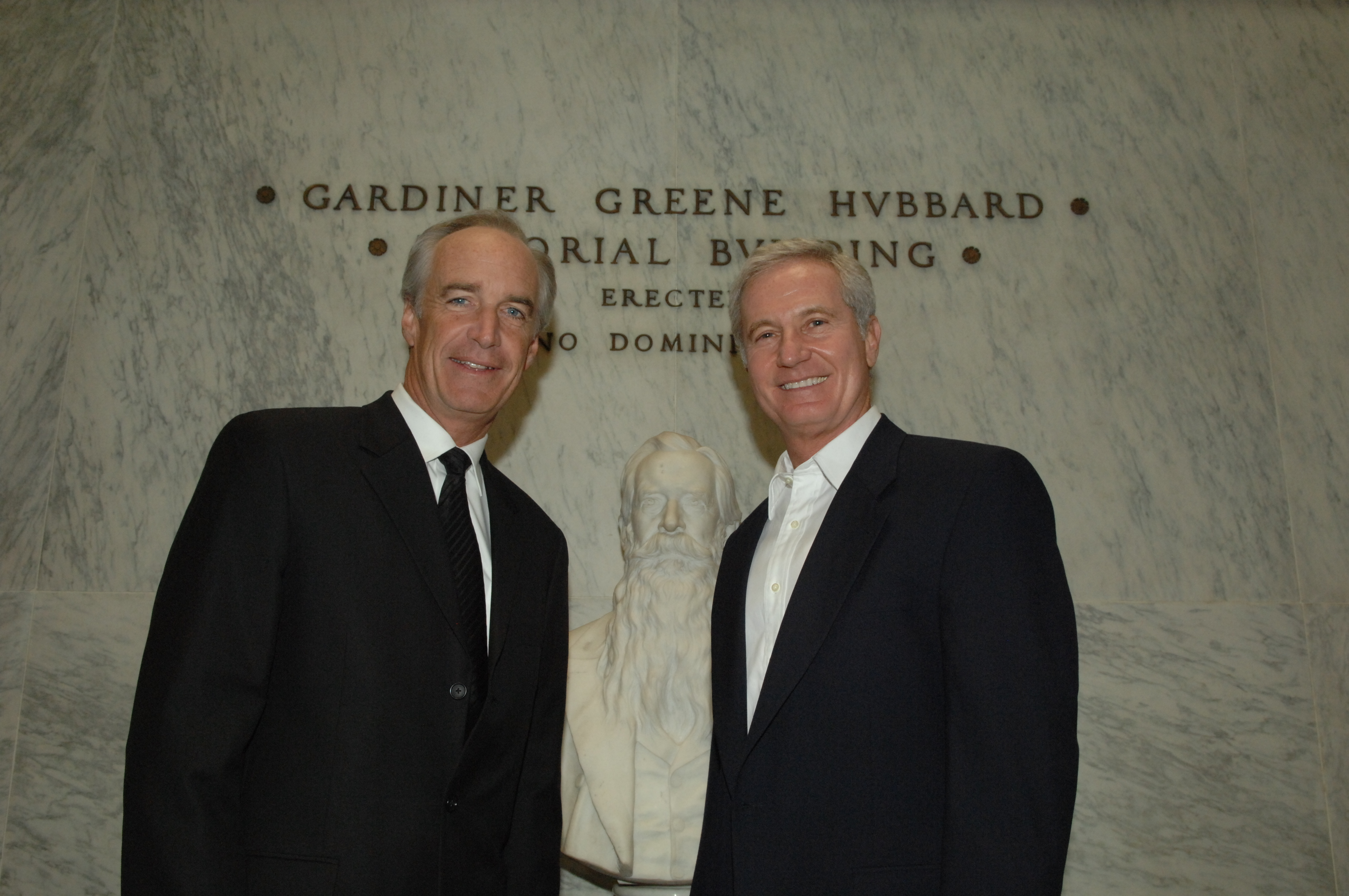
- Fahey in 2008

Chairman of the National Geographic Society
- In office January 2011 – February 2016
- Succeeded by: Jean Case

President of the National Geographic Society
- In office March 1998 – December 2010

CEO of the National Geographic Society
- In office March 1998 – December 2013
- Succeeded by: Gary Knell

Personal details
- Born: New York City
- Children: 3
- Education: Manhattan College; University of Michigan

John M. Fahey is chairman emeritus of the National Geographic Society. He was chief executive officer of the National Geographic Society from March 1998 to December 2013 and president of the organization from March 1998 to December 2010.

== National Geographic Society ==
During his tenure as president and CEO, Fahey led an evolution of the National Geographic Society, including its entry into cable television with the National Geographic Channels, currently available in more than 440 million homes in 171 countries in 48 languages; the international growth of National Geographic magazine, now published in English and 40 local-language editions; and the extension of National Geographic content into virtually every aspect of digital media. In addition to continuing the Society's efforts to improve geographic literacy, Fahey guided the significant expansion of the Society's Mission Programs during the past decade, including the creation of the National Geographic Explorers-in-Residence, Fellows and Emerging Explorers programs. Fahey also spearheaded the Society's move into the creation of regional grant-making programs around the world, beginning in Northern Europe and Asia.

In 2011, he received Peru's highest civilian award, "Orden del Sol del Peru", for his and National Geographic's role in helping retrieve a collection of ancient artifacts taken from Machu Picchu in 1912.

Fahey joined National Geographic on April 1, 1996, as the first president and chief executive officer of National Geographic Ventures, the nonprofit Society's wholly owned, taxable subsidiary. Prior to that, he was chairman, president and CEO of Time Life Inc., a wholly owned subsidiary of Time Warner Inc., for seven years. He worked previously for Home Box Office, where he was instrumental in the start up of CINEMAX. He also was a circulation manager for Time magazine. He later became a director of Time Inc. after its separation from Time Warner, and eventually served as its non-executive chairman for a year before its sale to Meredith Corporation in January 2018.

In February 2014, President Obama appointed Fahey to a six-year term on the Smithsonian Board of Regents, the governing body of the Smithsonian Institution. He also serves on the board and executive committee of the Smithsonian National Museum of Natural History as well as the boards of Johnson Outdoors Inc. and Lindblad Expeditions.

== Personal life ==
Born in New York City, Fahey received his B.S. in engineering from Manhattan College in 1973 and his M.B.A. from the University of Michigan. In 2008, he received the David D. Alger Alumni Achievement Award from the University of Michigan's Ross School of Business.

Fahey was selected as one of Advertising Age's top 100 marketers and by Irish American magazine as one of the top 100 Irish Americans. He and his wife, Heidi, live in Washington, D.C. They have three kids: CJ, Kenny, and Allie (Allison).

Non-profit organization positions
Preceded by Reg Murphy	President of the National Geographic Society; March 1998 – December 2010	Succeeded by Tim T. Kelly
Preceded by Reg Murphy	CEO of the National Geographic Society; March 1998 – December 2013	Succeeded by Gary Knell
Preceded by Gilbert M. Grosvenor	Chairman of the National Geographic Society; January 2011 – February 2016	Succeeded by Jean Case
