= Mr. Clutch =

Mr. Clutch is the nickname of:

- Francis Arnaiz (born 1951), Filipino basketball player
- Glenn Davis (halfback) (1924–2005), American football player
- Dante Lavelli (1923–2009), American football player
- Joe Sakic (born 1969), Canadian ice hockey player
- Pat Tabler (born 1958), American baseball player and sportscaster
- Adam Vinatieri (born 1972), American football player
- Jerry West (1938-2024), American basketball player
- Mike Trout (born 1991), American Baseball Player

== See also ==
- Clutch (disambiguation)
