= Gary Knell =

American CEO

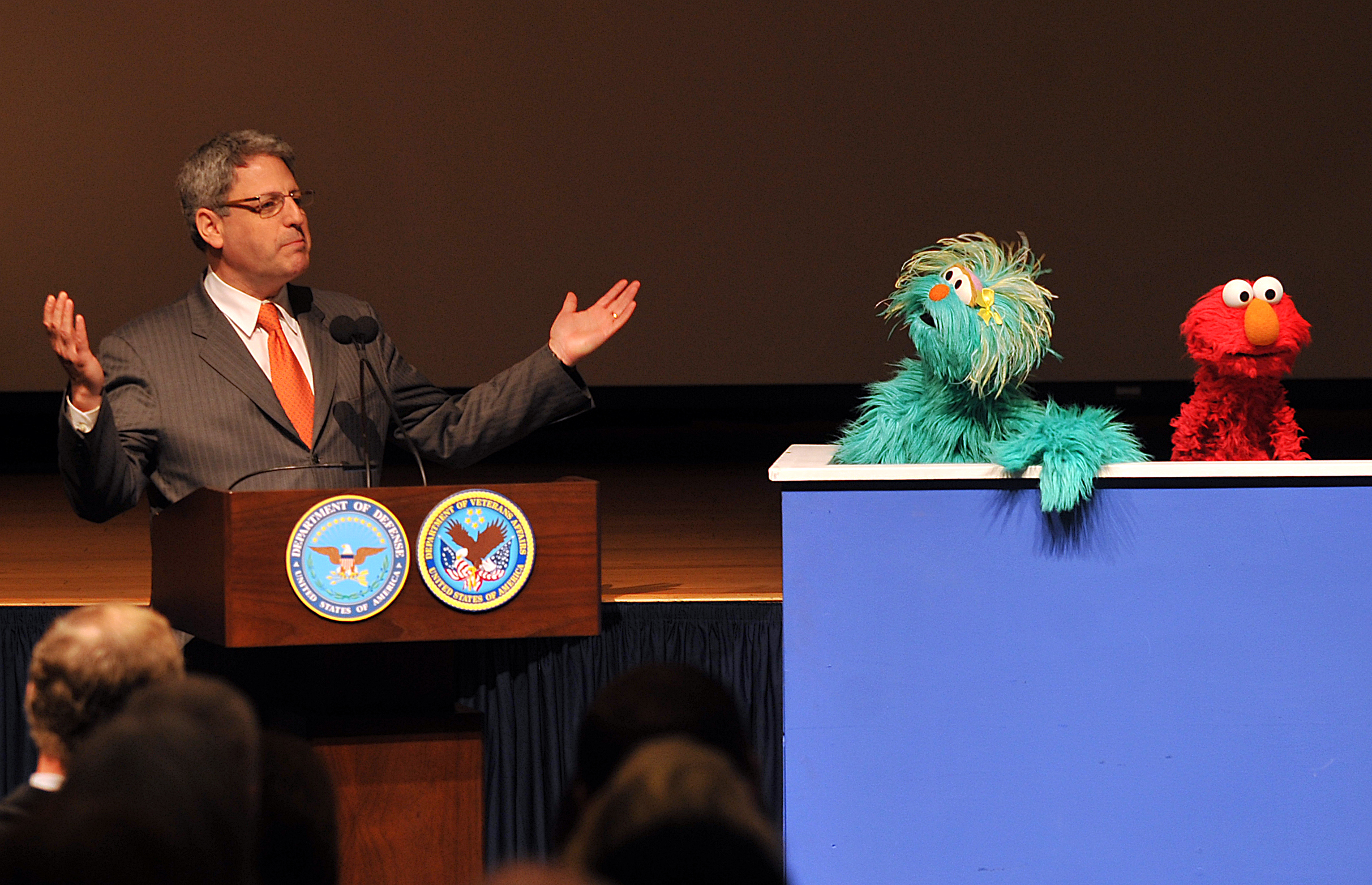
- Knell with Elmo and Rosita in 2009.
- Born: Gary Evan Knell; February 27, 1954 (age 72); Sacramento, California, U.S.
- Citizenship: United States
- Education: University of California, Los Angeles (B.A.); Loyola Law School (J.D.)
- Spouse: Kim Larson (m. 1981)
- Children: 4

Gary Evan Knell (born 27 February 1954) is a senior advisor at the Boston Consulting Group (BCG) in Media and Social Impact. He was previously the Chairman of National Geographic Partners. Formerly, he was president and CEO of the National Geographic Society. He joined National Geographic as chief executive in January 2014. He has been a member of the Society's board of trustees since April 2013 and has been on the board of governors of the National Geographic Education Foundation since November 2003.

From 2011 to 2013, he was president and CEO of National Public Radio (NPR). Prior to that, he was CEO of Sesame Workshop from 2000–2011.

== Early life ==
Knell graduated from Grant High School in Los Angeles, California, and earned a BA in political science from UCLA in 1975, followed by a Juris Doctor from Loyola Law School in L.A. in 1978. While at UCLA, he worked on the school's newspaper, the Daily Bruin.

== Career ==
Before joining National Geographic as president and CEO in 2014, Knell was president and CEO of National Public Radio from December 2011 to November 2013.

Knell was CEO of Sesame Workshop for 12 years before joining NPR in 2011. He joined the company in 1989 and assumed the role of COO in 1998 before moving into the CEO role in 2000. During his tenure at Sesame, the organization expanded its revenue base, audience and global recognition. Knell was instrumental in focusing the organization on Sesame Street's worldwide mission, including the creation of co-productions in South Africa, India, Northern Ireland and Egypt.

Before joining Sesame Workshop, Knell was managing director of Manager Media International, a print and multimedia publishing company based in Bangkok, Hong Kong, and Singapore. He has also was senior vice president and general counsel at WNET/Channel 13 in New York, was counsel to the U.S. Senate Judiciary and Governmental Affairs Committees in Washington, D.C., and worked in the California State Legislature and Governor's Office.

Knell is Executive Chairman of Common Sense Networks. He is also Vice Chair of the Board of Trustees of the San Diego Zoo Wildlife Alliance, is a member of the Council on Foreign Relations., and a board member of the Smithsonian National Museum of Natural History and StoryCorps. He is also cochair of the Aspen Institute's Climate and Education initiative.

A Gordon Grand Fellow at Yale University, Knell has been a guest lecturer at Harvard University, Duke University, Southern Methodist University, Carnegie Mellon University, and the University of Puerto Rico. He received honorary degrees from Kenyon College in Ohio and Mercy College in New York and has been the commencement speaker at Johns Hopkins University, UCLA, Columbia University, the University of Redlands, and the University of Texas at Austin.

Knell received a Bachelor of Arts degree in political science from UCLA, where he was editorial director of the UCLA Daily Bruin and a stringer for the Associated Press. He received a JD from Loyola University School of Law in Los Angeles.

== Personal life ==
Knell is married to Kim Larson, a non-profit board member. They have four children.

Preceded by John M. Fahey	President and CEO of National Geographic Society; 2014-2018	Succeeded by Tracy R. Wolstencroft; Michael L. Ulica
