= SixDegrees.org =

Charity led by actor, musician, and philanthropist Kevin Bacon

- Formation: January 18, 2007; 19 years ago
- Founder: Kevin Bacon
- Type: Nonprofit organization
- Headquarters: Alexandria, Virginia, United States
- Website: www.sixdegrees.org

SixDegrees.org is a charity led by actor Kevin Bacon. Launched on January 18, 2007, the organization builds on the popularity of the "small world phenomenon" by enabling people to become "celebrities for their own causes" by donating to or raising money for any charity in the United States. In March 2014, the organization celebrated the 20th anniversary of the Six Degrees of Kevin Bacon game by announcing plans to connect local changemakers with recognized celebrities through "drop-ins" and "shout-outs". Grassroots causes can submit events directly through the site and celebrities can contact the organization for help finding a cause anywhere in the world.

== History ==
To launch SixDegrees.org, Bacon attended the opening weekend of the Sundance Film Festival in Park City, Utah, where he and other celebrities encouraged charitable giving. By 2010, when Bacon was honored for his charitable activities by the Broadcast Film Critics Association, SixDegrees.org had raised nearly $3 million. Speaking at a Make a Difference Day appearance in 2012, Bacon explained that he had initially disliked the "Six Degrees of Kevin Bacon" game when it first became popular, but later decided that he should make use of its popularity for something positive that would carry his personal brand, and he joked: "I didn't really like the sound of The Footloose Foundation." Bacon headquartered SixDegrees.org in Alexandria, Virginia. During the first three weeks, more than 87,000 dollars in donations were generated on the site.

== Business model ==
Bacon was influenced to start SixDegrees.org because of a game called Six Degrees of Kevin Bacon. This game was made up to link Kevin Bacon to another arbitrarily-chosen actor. In this game an actor is selected at random and in six connections or less this actor is linked to Kevin Bacon. Bacon realized he could do the same thing with charitable organizations. He used this ideology of linking celebrities to charities to create the business model of SixDegrees.org.

SixDegrees.org uses celebrities pre-existing social media platforms to gain exposure on charitable organizations within their communities.

Bacon matched the top six non-celebrity fundraisers with 10,000 dollars during SixDegrees.org's first year.

The clothing company Hanes provided a 10,000-dollar grant to six charitable organizations of its choosing. These include Saving Georgia Dogs, Dachshund Rescue of North America Inc, Saving Shelter Pets Incorporated, Kat5 Animal Rescue Inc, Animal Action Rescue, and Maine People's Resource Center.

== Notable projects ==
Notable Stars	Charity
Kyra Sedgwick	Natural Resources Defense Council
Ashley Judd	YouthAIDS Charity
Rosie O'Donnell	Rosie's for All Kids Foundation
Jessica Simpson	Operation Smile
Bradley Whitford and Jane Kaczmarek	Clothes off Your Back

== See also ==
- Charity badge
- Network for Good
