= Breaking Vases =

2018 memoir by Dima Ghawi

Breaking Vases: Shattering Limitations & Daring to Thrive
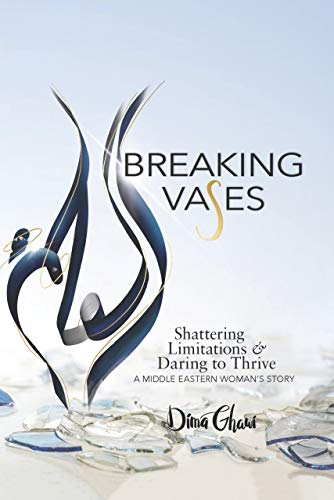
- Author: Dima Ghawi
- Audio read by: Dima Ghawi
- Language: English
- Genre: Memoir
- Publication date: 2018
- Pages: 232
- Awards: 2018 Writer’s Digest Grand Prize Winner, Best Indie Book Awards Winner, Reader's Favorite Book Award Winner, National Indie Excellence Awards Winner, Nautilus Book Awards Winner, Forward Indie’s Award Winner, Independent Press Award Winner, New York City Big Book Award Winner, Book Excellence Award Winner, International Book Award Winner, and The Ian Book of The Year Award Winner.
- ISBN: 978-0997809350
- Website: https://www.breakingvases.com

Breaking Vases: Shattering Limitations & Daring to Thrive is a memoir by Dima Ghawi.

== Overview ==
Growing up in a small Christian community in Jordan, Dima Ghawi was taught to be quiet and subservient to her elders and men, values ingrained by her conservative upbringing. At the age of five, Dima’s grandmother cautioned the young girl that a woman’s main responsibility was to preserve her image, as well as the honor of her family’s reputation. Anything less would be shameful. However, Dima’s grandmother also planted a seed: the hope that Dima could attend a formal university and become the first college-educated woman in her family.

At nineteen, struggling to free herself from cultural constraints and her father’s temper, Dima entered a traditional engagement with an older, affluent, and seemingly Western-minded jeweler. Newly married, she eagerly uprooted her life in Jordan and moved with him to San Diego.

However, California’s “Little Middle East” stood in sharp contrast to the vision of the American Dream Dima had once imagined. To her dismay, her husband proved far more traditional and controlling than she had expected. Breaking free from these confines would not be easy. It demanded a courage she had never before summoned. Yet, Dima's resolve was unwavering. She was determined to reshape her destiny, even if it meant standing alone and confronting daunting risks with unflinching determination.

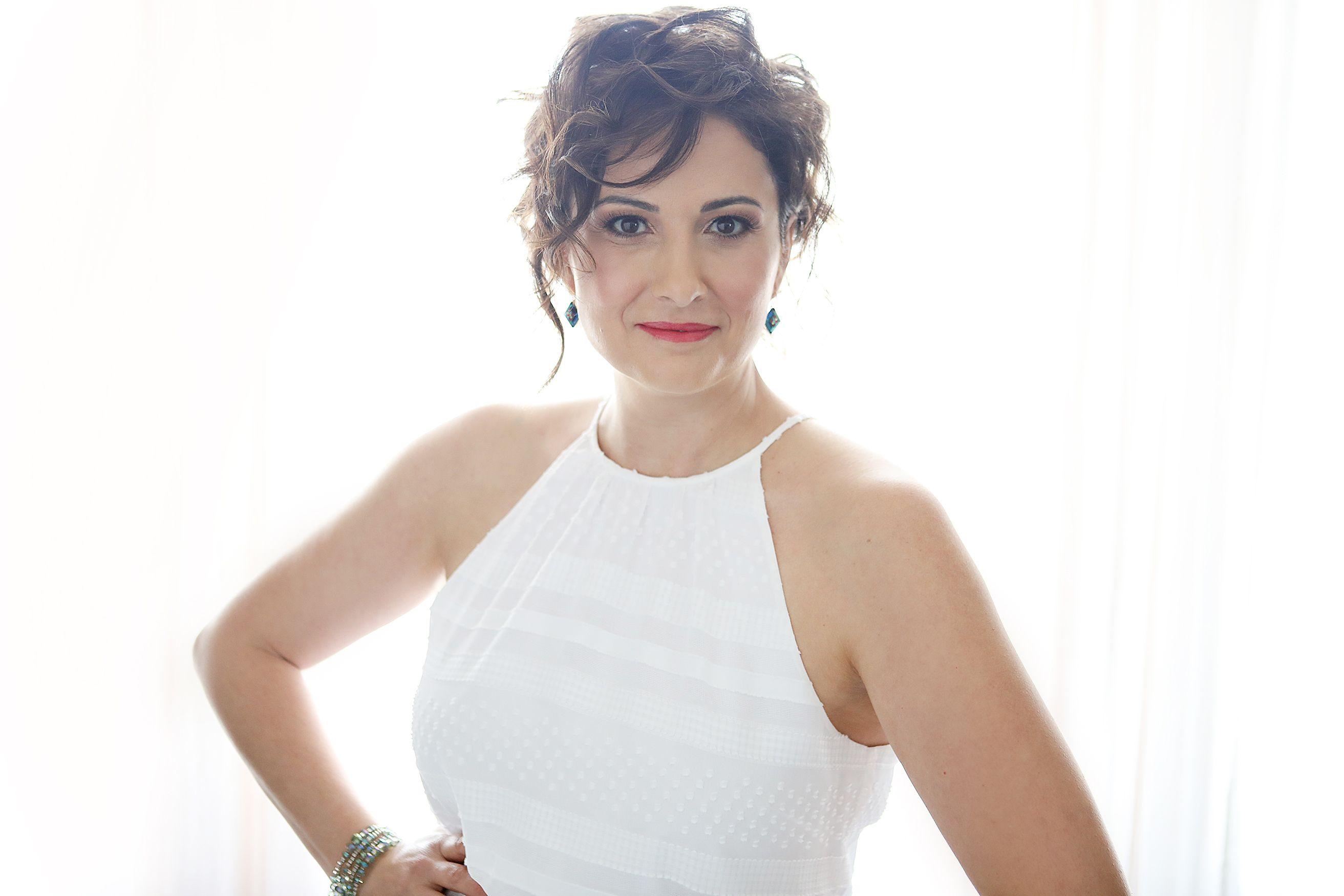
A headshot of Dima Ghawi.

== Reception ==
Shortly after publication, Breaking Vases was recognized as the 2018 Writer’s Digest Grand Prize Winner, a Best Indie Book Award Winner, Readers' Favorite Book Award Winner, National Indie Excellence Awards Winner, and a Nautilus Book Awards Winner.

William Carmichael of HRProfessionalsMagazine described Breaking Vases as “a captivating story about self-discovery, leadership, how education transcends all boundaries, and rising above the painful shards of internal and external limitations,” further praising the memoir’s insight into patriarchal oppression around the world.
