= Case Foundation =

American foundation

- Formation: 1997
- Headquarters: Washington, D.C., U.S.
- Chairman: Steve Case
- CEO: Jean Case
- Website: www.casefoundation.org

The Case Foundation is a Washington, DC-based private foundation founded in 1997 by AOL co-founder Steve Case and his wife Jean Case. The foundation describes its mission as "investing in people and ideas that can change the world.

== Partners ==
Some of the foundation's past grantees have included PlayPumps International, a nonprofit focused on improving the lives of children and their families through an innovative system that provides clean drinking water to rural African villages; City Year Washington, DC, an AmeriCorps organization that provides full-time, year-long service opportunities for young people through such initiatives as the Young Heroes service-learning program; Accelerate Brain Cancer Cure (ABC^{2}), a nonprofit that incorporates an entrepreneurial, venture capital approach and new forms of collaboration to hasten the discovery of a cure for brain cancer; America's Promise, an alliance of organizations serving children and youth; the Buxton Initiative, a nonprofit focused on fostering understanding among people from different faiths and world views through friendship and dialog; and many other local, national, and international organizations.

Other past foundation grantees and initiatives have included PowerUP, the Boys & Girls Clubs of America, Habitat for Humanity, MissionFish and Special Olympics.

== Initiatives ==
In 2007, the Case Foundation launched the Make It Your Own Awards, an online grants program that involved the public in decision making and design, and used online tools to empower applicants to raise funds and connect with supporters.

The foundation's 2007-2008 Giving Challenge—launched in partnership with Parade Magazine, Facebook, GlobalGiving, and Network for Good—empowered people to use technology to improve their giving experience, support the causes they care about, and encourage others to give.

Social Citizens^{BETA} explored the potential impact of the Millennial Generation on the civic landscape and encouraged feedback and discussion on the Social Citizens Blog.

== Leadership ==
Jean Case is CEO. In 2007, she was appointed by U.S. Secretary of State Condoleezza Rice as co-chair of the U.S.-Palestinian Partnership. She has also chaired the President's Council on Service and Civic Participation. And was Chairman of the Board of National Geographic from 2016-2025. Steve Case is Chairman.
