= Simon Perchik =

American poet (1923–2022)

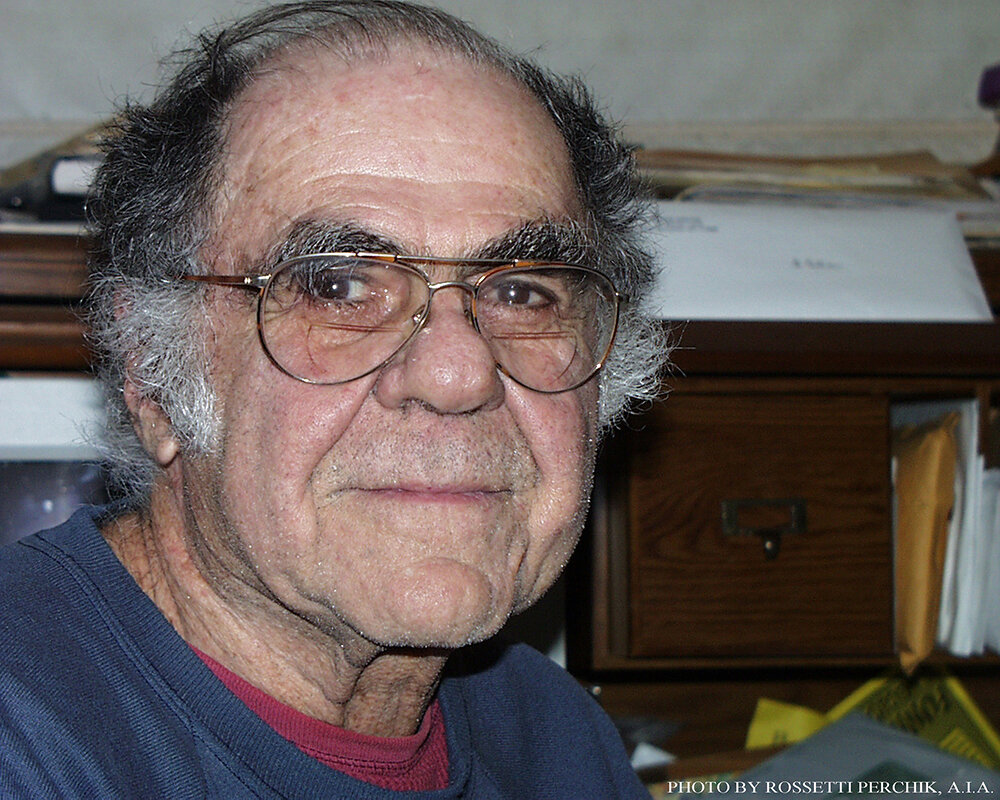
- Born: December 24, 1923; Paterson, New Jersey, U.S.
- Died: June 14, 2022 (aged 98); New York City, U.S.
- Writing career
- Language: English
- Genre: Poetry
- Website: simonperchikpoet.com

Simon Perchik (December 24, 1923 – June 14, 2022) was an American poet who has been described by Library Journal as, "the most widely published unknown poet in America." Perchik worked as an attorney before his retirement in 1980. Educated at New York University, he later resided in East Hampton, New York. Best known for his highly personal, non-narrative style of poetry, Perchik's work has appeared in over 30 books, websites including Verse Daily, Jacket and numerous print magazines, including The New Yorker, Poetry, Partisan Review, The Nation, North American Review, Weave Magazine, JuxtaProse Literary Magazine, and CLUTCH. His poetry collection, Hands Collected was longlisted for the 2000 National Book Award for Poetry.

On June 14, 2022, Perchik died surrounded by his family at the VA Hospital in New York City. He was 98.

== Selected bibliography ==
- "Bomber's Moon" (1949, Self-published, written on a rented typewriter and printed on a rented mimeograph machine)
- "I Counted Only April" (1964, The Elizabeth Press)
- "Twenty Years of Hands" (1966, The Elizabeth Press)
- "Which Hand Holds The Brother" (1969, The Elizabeth Press)
- "Hands You Are Secretly Wearing" (1972, The Elizabeth Press)
- "Both Hands Screaming" (1975, The Elizabeth Press)
- "The Club Fits Either Hand" (1979, The Elizabeth Press)
- "Mr Lucky" (1984, Shearsman Books)
- "The Snowcat Poems 1980-81, To the Photographs of Robert Frank" (1984, Linwood Publishers)
- "Who Can Touch These Knots: New and Selected Poems" (1985, The Scarecrow Press)
- "The Gandolf Poems" (1988, White Pine Press)
- "Redeeming The Wings" (1991, Dusty Dog Press)
- "Birthmark" (1992, Flockophobic Press)
- "The Emptiness Between My Hands" (1993, Dusty Dog Press)
- "Letters to the Dead" (1993, St. Andrews College Press)
- "*" ("Shearsman 19") (1994, Shearsman Books)
- "These Hands Filled With Numbness" (1996, Dusty Dog Press)
- "Hands Collected 1949-1999" (2000, Pavement Saw Press) (Second Edition, 2003)
- "Touching the Headstone" (2000, Stride Publications)
- "The Autochthon Poems" (2001, Split/Shift)
- "Rafts" (2007, Parsifal Editions)
- "Almost Rain" (2013, River Otter Press) ISBN 978-0983553069
- "D Poems" (2016, Penny University Press e-book)
- The Osiris Poems (2017, box of chalk) ISBN 978-0692628836
- Dreams I’ve Held – Uncollected Poems (1943–1979) (2021, Cholla Needles) ISBN 979-8539893033
- The Family Of Man Poems (1982–1990) (2021, Cholla Needles) ISBN 979-8674212379
- The Weston Poems (1991–1994) (2021, Cholla Needles) ISBN 979-8671462067
- Paper The Sun (1995–1996) (2021, Cholla Needles) ISBN 979-8675734801
- Peel The Sun (1997–1998) (2021, Cholla Needles) ISBN 979-8675699681
- The D Poems (2016) (2020, Cholla Needles - print version) ISBN 978-1709780851
- The Reflection in a Glass Eye Poems (2018) (2020, Cholla Needles) ISBN 979-8669460884
- The Gibson Poems (2019) (2019, Cholla Needles) ISBN 978-1090858566
- The Rosenblum Poems (2020) (2020, Cholla Needles) ISBN 978-1707244478
- The Elliott Erwitt Poems (2022) (2022, Cholla Needles) ISBN 979-8494057211

== Repositories ==
- Library of Congress, The Rare Book Collection.
- Simon Perchik Papers. Yale Collection of American Literature, Beinecke Rare Book and Manuscript Library.
- Ohio State University Library, Avant Writing Collection.
