= Butterfly clutch =

Pin fastener

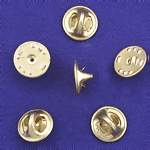
Butterfly clutches

A butterfly clutch, also known as a Ballou clutch, is a type of fastener that attaches to the back of a tack pin to secure an accessory to clothing.

The butterfly clutch was invented in 1942 by Frederick A. Ballou, Jr. and Melvin Moore of the B.A. Ballou Company and patented in the U.S. on January 12, 1943. The word "butterfly" refers to the motion of the prongs when the fastener is opened, which somewhat resembles that of butterfly wings. Originally composed of lightweight brass, butterfly clutches were first used to attach U.S. military insignia during World War II, gradually replacing straight pin and screw fasteners and older clutch designs. Subsequently, they have found widespread use in lapel pins of various kinds. Later designs added four or eight cleats on the back of the clutches to better grip the fabric. More recent innovations include locking clutches, rubber clutches, and magnetic pin backs, which attach to clothing without puncturing a hole through the material.

Butterfly clutches are less secure compared to other types of pins such as prongs and safety pins, especially when the surface of the medium they go through is thick (e.g. wool) or when the accessory to which clutches are applied is too heavy (e.g. military order). Butterfly clutches are sometimes known as dammits, especially in military circles, a reference to the ensuing frustration when one belonging to an important badge or medal is lost. DAMMITS is also a brand name used by the company Quik-Pin.
