= Clutch (literary magazine) =

American literary magazine (1992–1997)

- Editor: Daniel Hodge, Lawrence Oberc
- Categories: Literary magazine
- Publisher: Drill Press
- Founded: 1992
- Final issue Number: 1998; 6
- Country: US
- Language: English

Clutch was an annual literary magazine that existed between 1992 and 1997. Edited by Daniel Hodge and Lawrence Oberc, it published poetry, fiction, and interviews. It began in Kentucky in 1991 and then moved to San Francisco.

The magazine grew out of the editors' interests and experiences in the subculture of alternative presses and little magazines, as well as their previous experience in working on the staffs of literary journals at the University of Kentucky. After the first issue was published in 1991, the magazine moved its editorial headquarters to San Francisco, where it resided for the remainder of its history. The sixth and final issue was published with an imprint date of 1997/1998.

Clutch published original poetry and prose by writers including Charles Bukowski, Kurt Nimmo, Lorri Jackson, Peter Plate, John Bennett, Poe Ballantine, Simon Perchik, Robert Peters, Denise Dee and Todd Moore, as well as Hodge and Oberc. A small press imprint, Drill Press, was originally created as a publishing vehicle for CLUTCH, and also produced some small chapbooks of poetry featuring writers that had appeared in CLUTCH, including Moore and Oberc.

Clutch forms part of the Lawrence Oberc Zine Collection at De Paul University, containing Oberc's personal zine collection and documenting his contribution to the underground press.
