= J. Reginald Murphy =

American journalist (1933–2024)

- Born: John Reginald Murphy; January 7, 1934; Gainesville, Georgia, U.S.
- Died: November 9, 2024 (aged 90); St. Simons Island, Georgia, U.S.
- Occupations: Publisher and business executive
- Known for: Being kidnapped in 1974

John Reginald Murphy (January 7, 1934 – November 9, 2024), usually known as Reg Murphy, was an American publisher, author and business executive.

== Professional life ==
=== Journalism and editing ===
A native of Gainesville, Georgia who attended Mercer University, Murphy began his career in journalism with the Macon Telegraph, and was awarded a Nieman Fellowship at Harvard University, where he studied from 1958 to 1960. He became editor of the Atlanta Constitution, editor and publisher of The San Francisco Examiner, and publisher and CEO of The Baltimore Sun.

Murphy was president and CEO of the National Geographic Society from 1996 to 1998.

=== Golf ===
From 1994 to 1995, Murphy served as the president of the United States Golf Association. He authored a biography of Griffin Bell, Uncommon Sense: The Achievement of Griffin Bell.

=== Academics ===
In 2012 he served as Executive-in-Residence at the College of Coastal Georgia.

== Kidnapping ==
Murphy was kidnapped on February 20, 1974, at the age of 40, and was freed two days later after the Atlanta Constitution paid $700,000 ransom.

Murphy was well known for his stance against the Vietnam War, but the motive for the kidnapping is still unknown. William A. H. Williams was arrested for the crime only six hours after Murphy was released, and all of the money was recovered.

Williams was convicted and sentenced to 40 years in jail but served only nine; his wife Betty received probation for not reporting her husband to police. Williams claimed to represent a right-wing militia group called The American Revolutionary Army, protesting against "too leftist and too liberal" media outlets and a government which was a “fraud and a murderer on a mass scale”, and sought to have all federal elected officials resign.

In 2019, contacted by a journalist, Williams apologised for the kidnapping.

== Personal life and death ==
Murphy had a wife, Diana, and two daughters. He died in St. Simons Island, Georgia, on November 9, 2024, at the age of 90.

== See also ==
- List of kidnappings

== Relevant sources ==
- Rawling, Wiliam. 2026. A Portrait of a Live Well Lived: Reg Murphy. Mercer University Press.
