= MissionFish =

Online fundraising platform

- Formation: 1999
- Founder: Sean Milliken

Founded in 1999, MissionFish is the partner charity of eBay, which runs auction and shopping websites in 30 countries. Through MissionFish, eBay users are able to donate to registered nonprofit organisations when they buy and sell through the eBay.com and eBay.co.uk sites. The programmes are called eBay Giving Works and eBay for Charity, respectively.

In June 2008, eBay announced that its global user base, through eBay Giving Works and eBay for Charity, had raised over $150M for good causes from listings created around the world.

== History and milestones ==
MissionFish was launched in the US in 2000 as an online exchange, where nonprofits could accept in-kind gifts, keep anything useful, and sell the rest. MissionFish was supported by Points of Light (formerly the Points of Light Foundation), The Case Foundation, and The Pew Charitable Trusts.

In 2003, eBay and MissionFish collaborated to build the eBay Giving Works programme, which enables eBay sellers to donate a percentage of their proceeds to the registered nonprofit of their choice.

Later that year, the nonprofit Communities in Schools auctioned lunches with leaders through eBay Giving Works, raising $157,000.

By May 2004, over 2000 nonprofits had signed up for eBay Giving Works, and had raised about $30m.

In 2004 MissionFish was awarded First Place for growth stage ventures in the Social Enterprise Alliance’s 2004 Earned Income Showcase. In 2005, MissionFish was a Grand-Prize winner of the Yale School of Management and Goldman Sachs Foundation's joint Partnership on Nonprofit Ventures.

MissionFish (UK) was set up in 2005, and began working on eBay for Charity that year. The first eBay for Charity auction took place in November 2005 for the charity BBC Children in Need.

In 2006, the NSPCC ran part of its Dream Auction through eBay for Charity, raising over £500,000.

eBay for Charity opened to all registered charities in 2006. Since then, over 5,500 charities have joined the programme, raising over £27m.

== Recent developments ==
In May 2008, eBay and MissionFish relaunched eBay Giving Works and eBay for Charity, incorporating all MissionFish’s donation functions within eBay users’ My eBay accounts. This change removed the need for donors to register separate accounts with MissionFish, and led to a considerable growth in charity listings. As of July 2008, there were over 100,000 live listings benefiting charities on the eBay websites.

In June 2008 a lunch with investor and philanthropist, Warren Buffett, was sold to a Chinese businessman for $2.1m, becoming the most expensive charity item ever to be sold on eBay. It narrowly beat the record set by Rush Limbaugh, when he auctioned a letter of complaint about his on-air remarks signed by 41 democratic senators.

In July 2008, two board members of MissionFish UK, Abbie Rumbold and Mike Kelly, were appointed to the Cabinet Office’s third sector advisory panel, which was set up to provide ministers “with clear and authoritative advice on policy regarding the third sector.”

== Products and donation processing ==
In 2009, MissionFish launched new giving products on eBay, enabling eBay users to make cash donations to charity when they shop and browse the eBay site. eBay buyers are enabled to add a small donation at checkout, has raised over $5m in the US, and over £2.5m in the UK.

MissionFish is partly funded by deductions from donations. These vary from 3.75% for cash donations, up to around 11%-20% from donations made from the proceeds of eBay sales, on a sliding scale. (For US sellers, the scale is as follows: 20% of the first $50, 15% of the next $50–$199, 10% of the next $200–$999 of each individual donation for processing costs)

== See also ==
- Network for Good
