= Charity badge =

A charity badge is a widget used on websites, blogs, social networks or e-mail for promotion of some humanitarian initiative, mainly gathering donations for charity projects.

The idea was initiated by the Yahoo! search engine and the Network for Good charity aggregator.

Some companies allow website owners or bloggers to make a personalized badge for setting up a link to a favourite charity, creating the possibility of wide social involvement for donations.

Surveys suggest 61% of people give to a charity because a personal connection has asked them to make a contribution.

The charity badge method of giving has gained popularity among communities of online users. Yahoo! promote a contest for gathering the biggest quantity of one-time donations.

== See also ==
- Network for good
- SixDegrees.org
