= President's Volunteer Service Award =

American award bestowed for outstanding service to nation

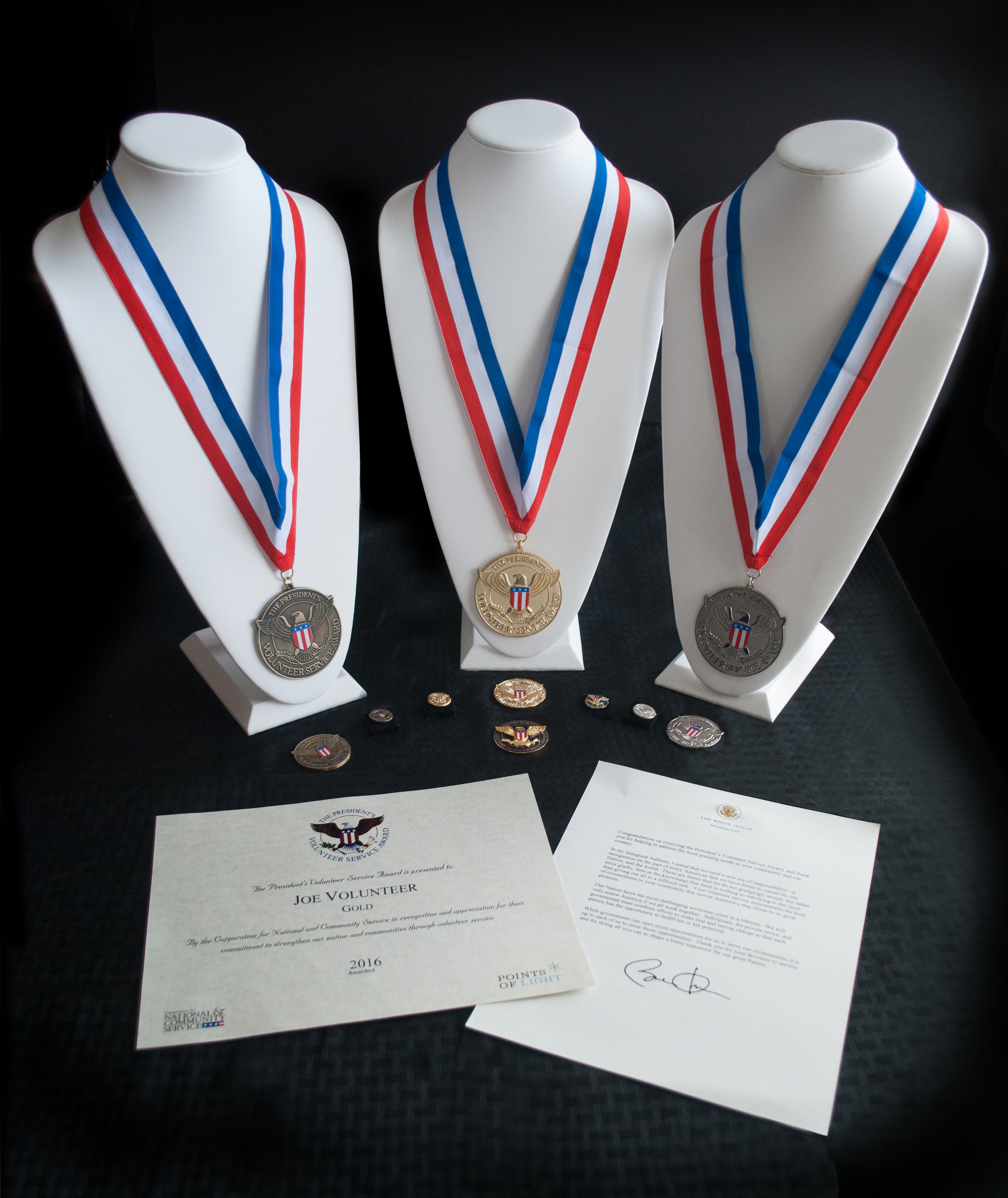
- PVSA award pieces
- Awarded for: Recognition of outstanding volunteer contributions in community service to the United States
- Sponsored by: Corporation for National and Community Service; President of the United States; Points of Light Foundation
- Country: United States
- Presented by: The President of the United States
- First award: 2003; 23 years ago
- Website: Official website
- Ribbon of the award

The President's Volunteer Service Award is a civil award bestowed by the President of the United States. Established by executive order by George W. Bush, the award was established to honor volunteers that give hundreds of hours per year helping others. The award can be granted to individuals, families and organizations locate throughout the United States. Depending on the amount of service hours completed, individuals can receive the Bronze, Silver, Gold, and/or the Lifetime Achievement Award.

The President's Lifetime Achievement Award (also called the President's Call to Service Award) is the highest level, and it has been awarded to Americans to recognize over 4,000 hours of volunteer service. Awardees may receive a personalized certificate, an official pin, medallion, and/or a congratulatory letter from the President depending on the award earned. Orders for the award were put on pause indefinitely starting May 27, 2025.

== Purpose and establishment ==
The purpose for the President's Volunteer Service Award is to honor the hundreds of thousands of people across America that have volunteered hundreds, if not thousands of volunteer hours over their lifetime. The program was established to honor the volunteer works of individuals, families and organizations throughout the United States. There have been several variations of this program using different names, including the President's Volunteer Action Award from the 1980s.

The current program is called the President's Volunteer Service Award and was created by President George W. Bush in 2002. He made this program known during his State of the Union address. After September 11, 2001, President Bush saw the need to renew the interest in helping one's neighbors and called upon all Americans to help by volunteering their time. As part of this request, he created several new programs, including the Citizen Corps, and the President's Volunteer Service Award to be given to those that help to make a difference.

In January 2003, Bush signed an executive order that created the President's Council on Service and Civic Participation within the Corporation for National and Community Service (AmeriCorps). The council was established to recognize the important contributions Americans of all ages are making within their communities through service and civic engagement.

The President's Volunteer Service Award has two award types (individual and family) and four award levels (Bronze, Silver, Gold and Lifetime Achievement), with required annual hours varying by age range of the recipient for the Bronze, Silver, and Gold level awards. The Lifetime Achievement award requires a minimum of 4,000 hours of documented volunteer service. Depending on the level of service, awardees may receive a personalized certificate, an official pin, medallion, and/or a congratulatory letter from the President.

During late 2019 and much of 2020, the Lifetime Award was "under review". Volunteers who reached the required 4,000 hours of service were unable to receive the Lifetime Achievement award during that time. In 2021, the Lifetime Achievement Award was made available again, and the President Biden-issued congratulatory letter became available. The award was put on pause indefinitely starting May 27, 2025.

== Requirements ==
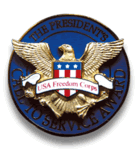

Recipients must have contributed their volunteer hours under the auspices of a Certifying Organization/ Leadership Organization. That organization must submit an application on behalf of the intended recipient, a record of the volunteer's hours, and a payment to the PVSA. The Organization must be based in the United States or Puerto Rico. The award is not competitive, and there are no other requirements.

Volunteers are requested to maintain a log of hours that are volunteered and when requesting a President's Volunteer Service Award are required to present this information for certification. As of 2019, individuals must track their volunteer hours without the benefit of the PVSA website. While the President's Volunteer Service Award website for years offered the hours-of-service tracking to individuals and groups who had registered on the PVSA website, that functionality was removed in 2019. In late August 2019, the program announced that individual volunteers who had been previously tracked their hours on the PVSA website would be able to download a historical record of their hours. Some organizations will track hours on behalf of volunteers so they do not have to track them manually.

Hundreds of thousands of Americans have been awarded all levels of the President's Volunteer Service Award.

== See also ==
- List of volunteer awards
