= Double Clutch (video game) =

1993 video game

- Developer: BGS Development
- Publisher: Sega
- Programmer: Lasse Faabeng
- Artist: Torben Bakager Larsen
- Composer: Brandon Didier
- Platform: Mega Drive
- Release: PAL: June 1993
- Genre: Racing
- Modes: Single-player, multiplayer

Double Clutch is a racing video game developed by BGS Development for the Mega Drive. It was published by Sega in the PAL region in 1993.

== Gameplay ==
Double Clutch is a racing video game from an overhead perspective, in which players race against other opponents around a track. It is played in either one or two players. The main objective for the player is to qualify for the next race by finishing in the top three in a three-lap race. The game ends if the player finishes in fourth place; in a two-player game, the game continues for both players as long as one of them is in the top three. At the beginning of the game, players can choose one of the drivers, each has their own driving type. The game also features various weather conditions, such as rain and snow.

If the player finishes in the top three after each race, they can earn the amount of money depending on the driver's position. Earnings can be used for players to buy parts and make improvements to their vehicle. Players can change one of three difficulty levels, which determine the speed of the opponent racers and a number of laps; on a hardest setting, players race on five laps. In practice mode, players can race on any of the first four tracks.

== Reception ==
Reception

Review scores
Publication	Score
Mean Machines Sega	67%
Mega	20%
Mega Zone	74%

The game received mixed reviews upon release. Mean Machines Sega gave it a generally positive review, saying it is fast, smooth, and playable, but comparing it unfavourably with Micro Machines. Mega were harshly critical of the game, calling it "extremely dull", before recommending Micro Machines instead.
