= Network for Good =

Fundraising software company

- Formation: 2001
- Location: Washington, D.C.
- CEO: Bill Strathmann (until 2023)
- Website: www.networkforgood.com

Network for Good is an American-certified B Corporation software company that offers fundraising software and coaching for charities and non-profit organizations. The company was founded in 2001 by America Online (AOL), Cisco Systems, and Yahoo! and has processed over $2.2 billion in donations since its inception. Network for Good charges between 3% and 5% transaction processing fee for donations, in addition to any subscription fees that the charity might incur. The transaction processing costs may be covered by the donor or by the nonprofit organization.

== History ==
Network for Good was set up in 2001 as a collaboration among America Online, Cisco Systems and Yahoo, replacing AOL's earlier charitable platform, Helping.org. By 2002 it was reporting receipts of about $1 million per month, and by 2005 it reported about $30 million in annual collections. In 2005 Network for Good absorbed Groundspring, another online charitable platform that had been founded by the Tides Foundation in 1999.

In 2007 actor Kevin Bacon collaborated with Network for Good to set up his charitable project, SixDegrees.org, as a "celebrity-based" variant on Network for Good's existing model.

In 2008 Network for Good acquired the ePhilanthropy Foundation, an organization established in 2001 with the goal of providing training and promoting ethical practices in online fundraising and that had later faced uncertainty after the departure of its founder.

As of February 2014, Network for Good reported that it had processed more than $1 billion in gifts since its inception.

In 2023, CEO Bill Strathmann left the company. This followed Bonterra's acquisition of the company in 2022.

In 2025, Network for Good rebranded as "For Good".

== Management ==
As well as its headquarters, it also has an office in San Francisco, California, through its 2005 merger with Groundspring.org. Board members are composed of people who have previously worked with various other companies such as AOL, Yahoo! and eBay.

== Services ==
=== Non-profit services ===
Non-profits can access tools for online fundraising, email marketing, events management and expert advice. Nonprofits can also receive free tips and training on topics including how to develop and improve their online marketing, donor communications and fundraising. Network for Good offers webinars, e-books, courses, newsletters, and how-to articles.

Competitors of Network for Good that also provide nonprofit online donation platforms include CrowdRise, Classy, Razoo, Aplos Software, and Blackbaud.

== Studies ==
Network for Good publishes a Digital Giving Index, based on the 2010 Online Giving Study. This data is based on Network for Good's own yearly donation processing activities and shows the annual changes in donation volume, average donation, and other trends in online giving.

Network for Good publishes multiple e-books and white-papers each year on topics ranging from disaster giving to social media. The organization also sponsored "How Crisis Compels Donors to Give Online", a study on online donations during disasters such as Hurricane Katrina, and "The Wired Fundraiser", a study reflecting how current technology is changing the world of fundraising.

== Controversy ==
Exodus Global Alliance is not a Network for Good Customer but uses its DonateNow Lite product, which is free and available to all 501(c)3 charities listed on Candid, to raise money for sexual orientation conversion therapy.

== See also ==
- Charity badge
- Charity Navigator
- Crowdrise
- GuideStar
- MissionFish
- SixDegrees.org
