= Lapel pin =

Small pin worn on clothing, often worn on the lapel of a jacket

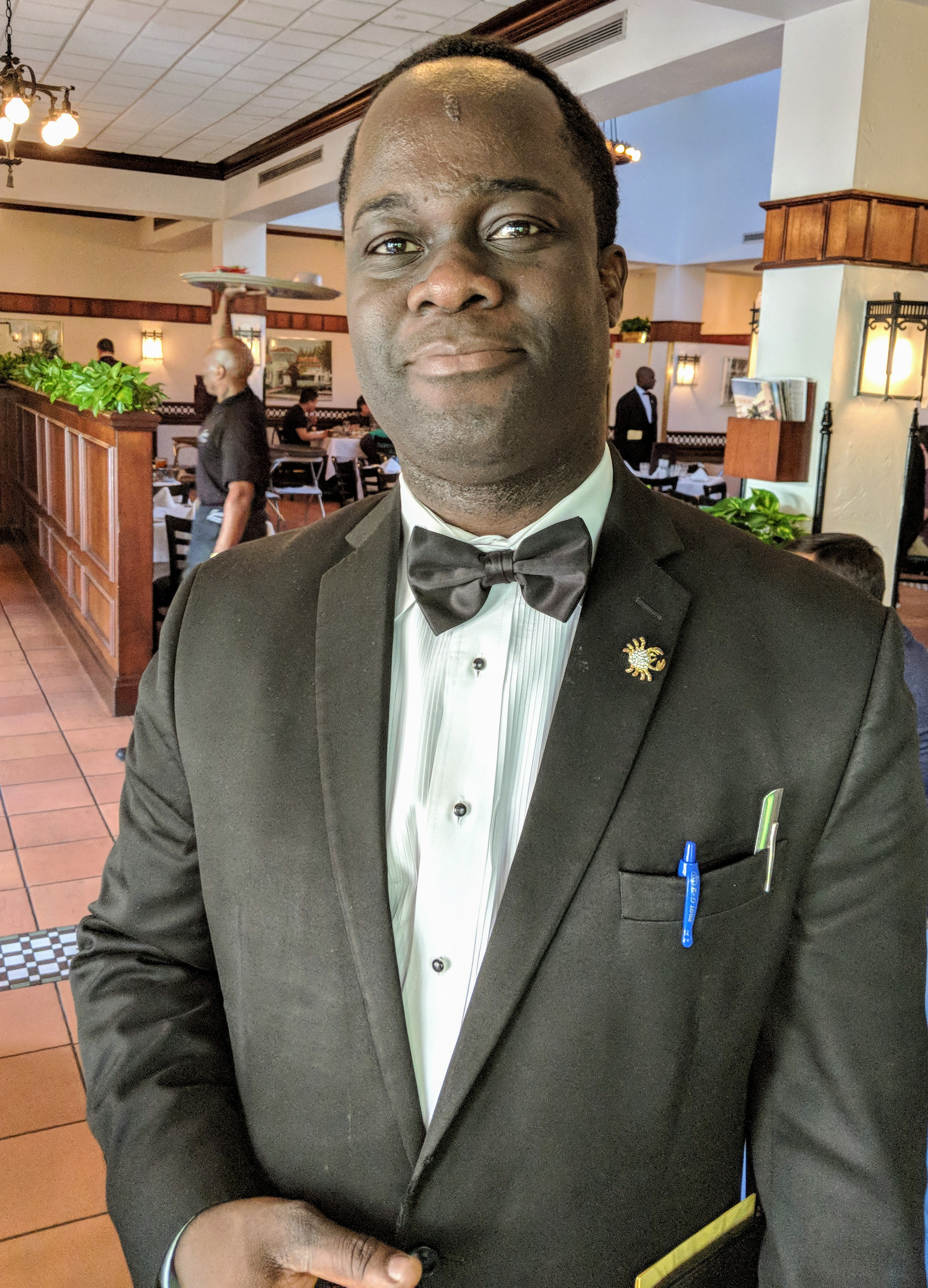
A waiter at Joe's Stone Crab wearing a crab lapel pin

A lapel pin, also known as an enamel pin, is a small pin worn on clothing, often on the lapel of a jacket, attached to a bag, or displayed on a piece of fabric. Lapel pins can be decorative, or can indicate the wearer's affiliation with a cause or an organization, such as a fraternal order or religious order; in the case of a chivalric order, the lapel pin is in the form of a rosette. Before the popularity of wearing lapel pins, boutonnières were worn.

Pins are often collected and traded.

== Popular usage ==
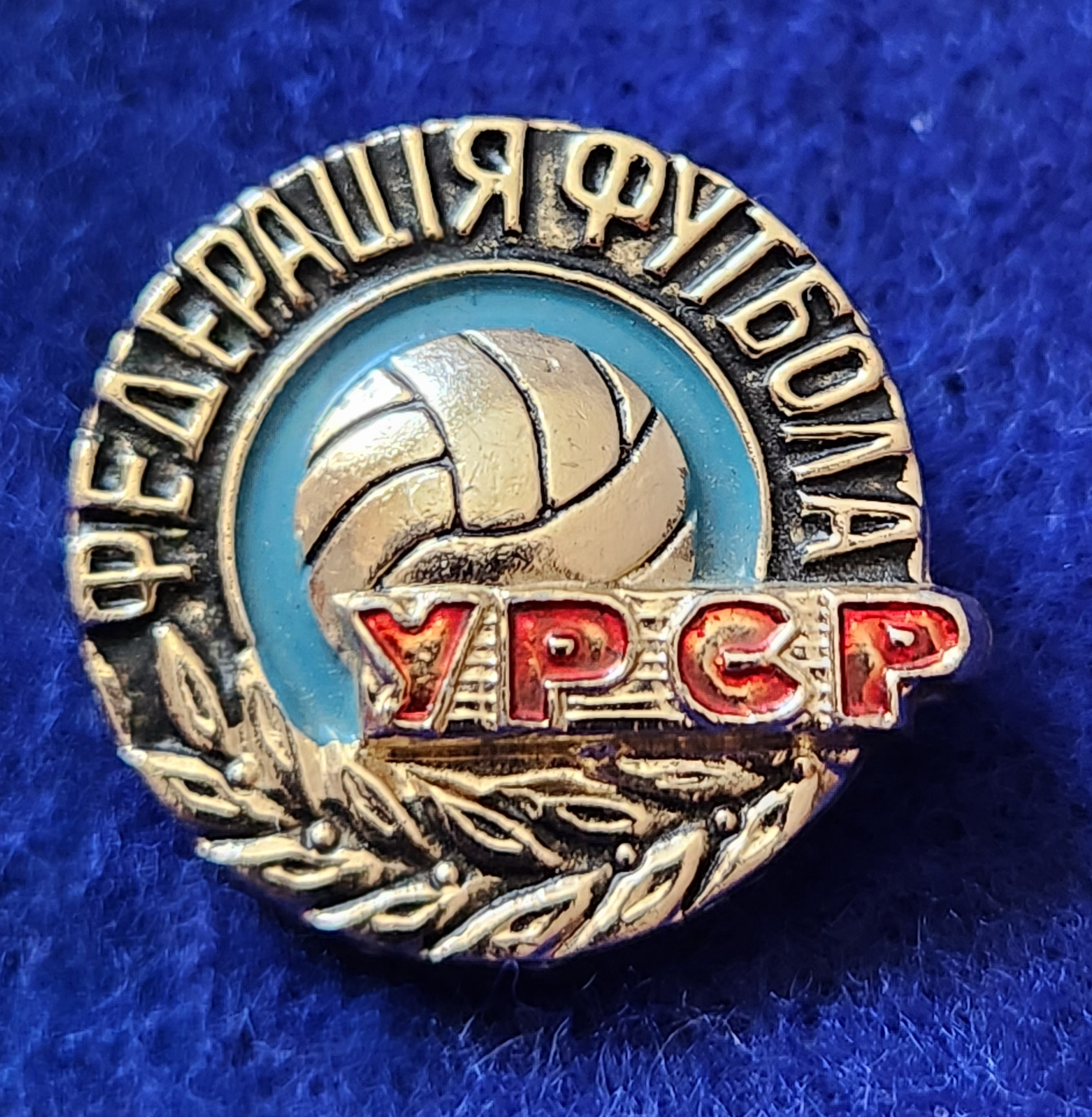
Soviet sports pin

Lapel pins are frequently used as symbols of achievement and belonging in different organizations. Lapel pins from the organization are often collected by members and non-members alike.

Businesses and political parties also use lapel pins to designate achievement and membership. Lapel pins are a common element of employee recognition programs, and they are presented to individuals as a symbol of an accomplishment. Like fraternity and sorority pins, these lapel pins instill a sense of belonging to an elite group of performers at the organization. Businesses also award lapel pins to employees more frequently to boost employee morale, productivity, and employee engagement.

The Soviet Union had great production of these. Besides pins showing political figures and as souvenirs for tourist spots, there were pins for various sports, cultural, and political gatherings and for technical achievements of the Soviet Union.

Pin collecting and trading has also become a popular hobby. Demand for pin designs based on popular cartoon characters and themes such as Disney, Betty Boop, and Hard Rock Cafe has surged and led to the creation of pin trading events and other social activities. Disney pin trading is a prime example of this.

== Political symbols ==
=== Americas ===
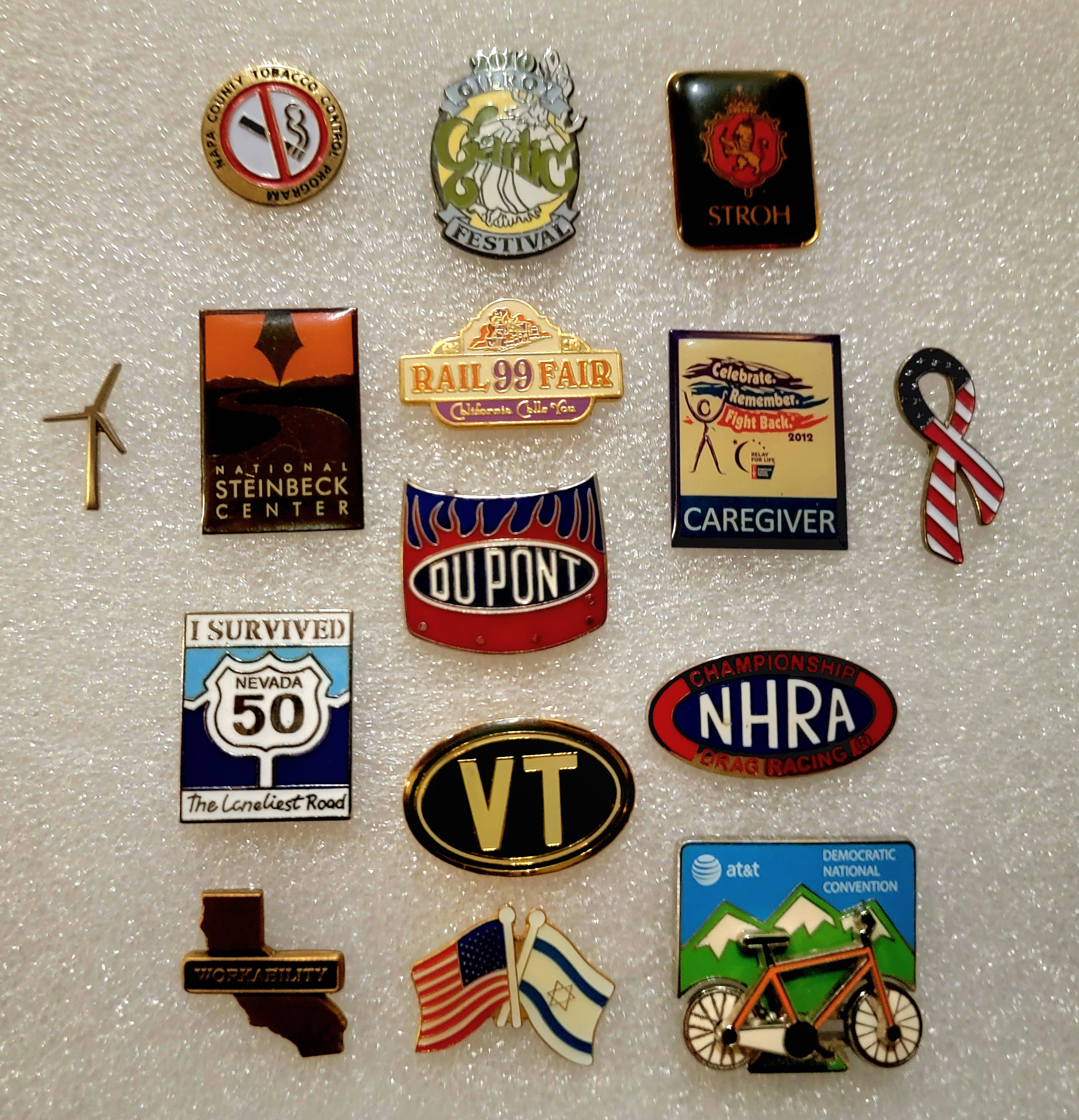
A small collection of American lapel pins

In the United States, the flag did not become a symbol of individual patriotism until the Civil War. As the Confederacy gained early victories, Northerners began displaying the flag on their homes and businesses as a show of support for the Union. After the war, this civilian identification with the flag persisted, laying the groundwork for it to eventually become a widespread personal accessory. Before the mid-20th century, however, flag lapel pins were exceedingly rare; the standardized flag pin as a fashion and political item did not emerge until the 1950s.

Politicians in the United States often wear American flag lapel pins, especially after the attacks of September 11, 2001. By 2008, the flag pin had become "the quickest sartorial method for a politician to telegraph his or her patriotism", according to Time magazine. The practice declined somewhat in the following decade.

The modern American political tradition of wearing a flag lapel pin is generally traced to President Richard Nixon, who was the first U.S. president to make it a regular feature of his attire. According to historians and flag memorabilia collectors, flag-related jewelry was rare for both men and women until the 1950s, as prior to that era one might find only uncommon flag brooches or formal tuxedo buttons. Nixon's adoption of the pin is widely attributed to a scene he observed in the 1972 Robert Redford film The Candidate, after which he directed his White House staff to begin wearing flag pins as well. During the Vietnam War, the pin became a political flashpoint: supporters wore it to signal patriotism, while anti-war demonstrators sometimes wore the pin upside down—the traditional maritime signal for distress—as a form of protest.

=== Asia and Europe ===
In the 1970s, initiates of Guru Maharaj Ji extensively used buttons, sometimes quite large, with images of the guru's face on them.

In the USSR and the People's Republic of China, lapel pins with portraits of Lenin and Mao Zedong, respectively, were worn by youth as well as by Communist party members or people who felt like showing their official political credo. In Czechoslovakia, the Mao badges/pins were worn in the late 1960s and early 1970s by non-conformist youth as a prank and a way to provoke the "normalisationist" reactionaries of the purged post-1968 Communist Party of Czechoslovakia.

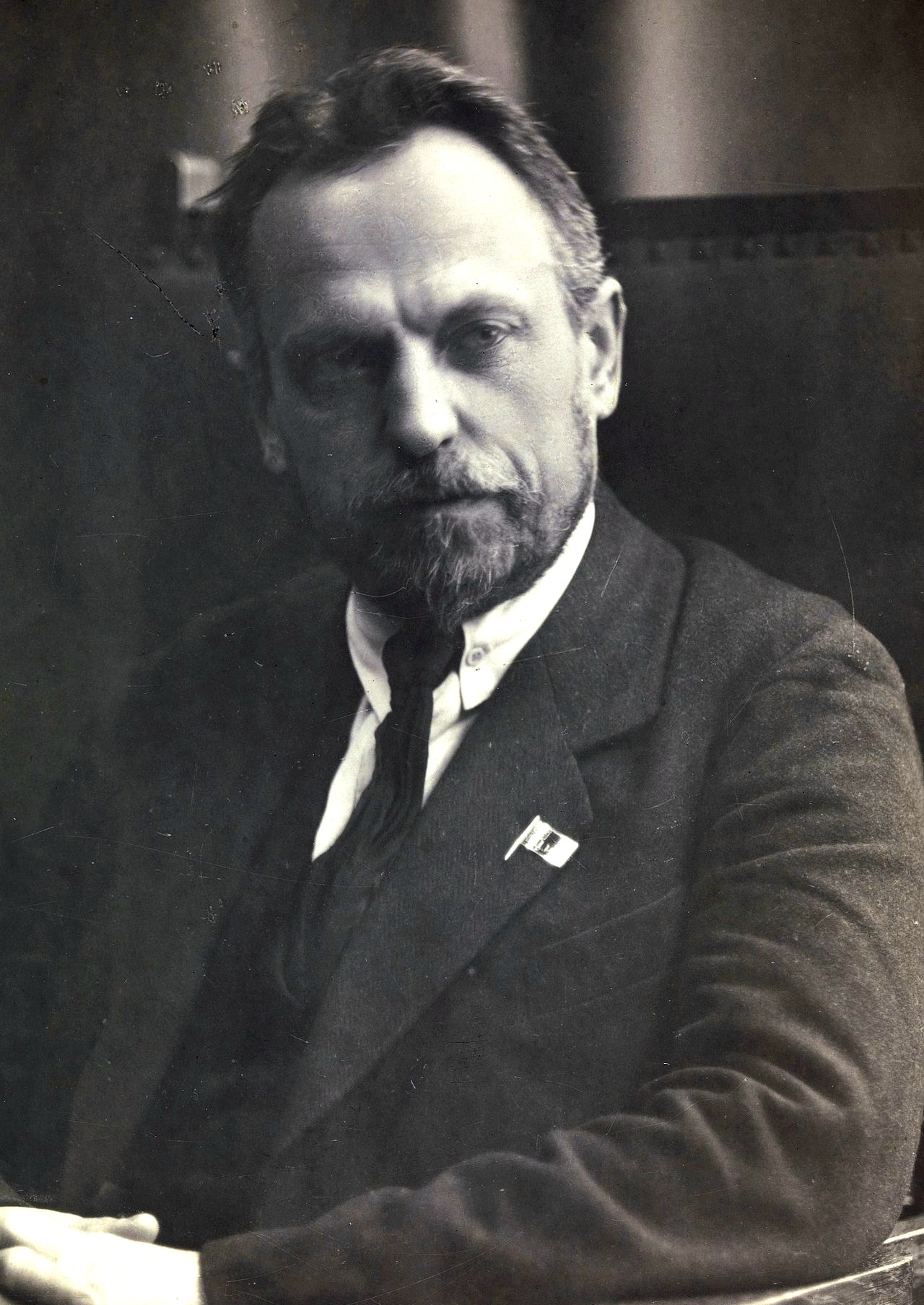
Nikolai Semashko wearing a pin in 1922

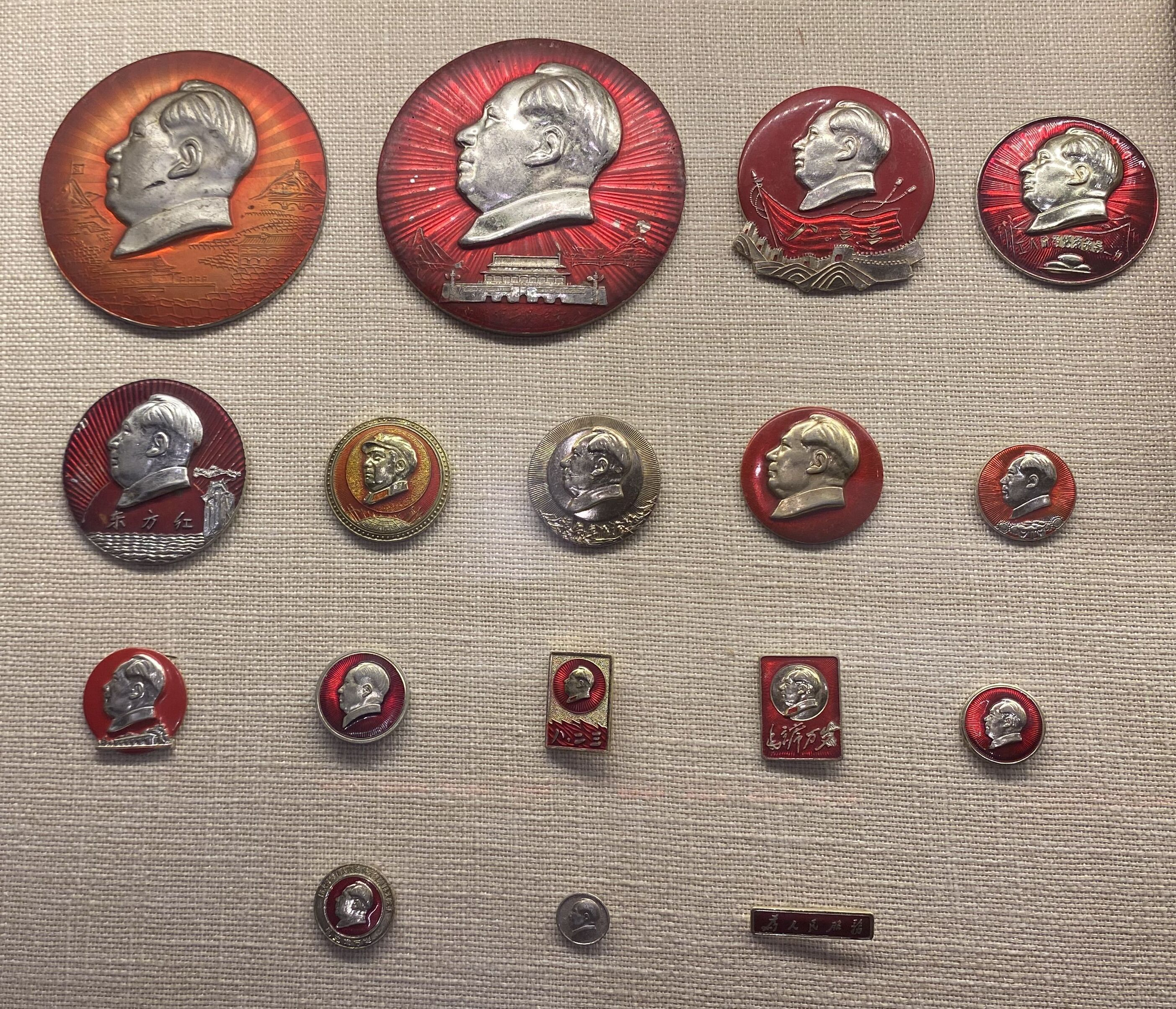
A collection of Chairman Mao lapel pins

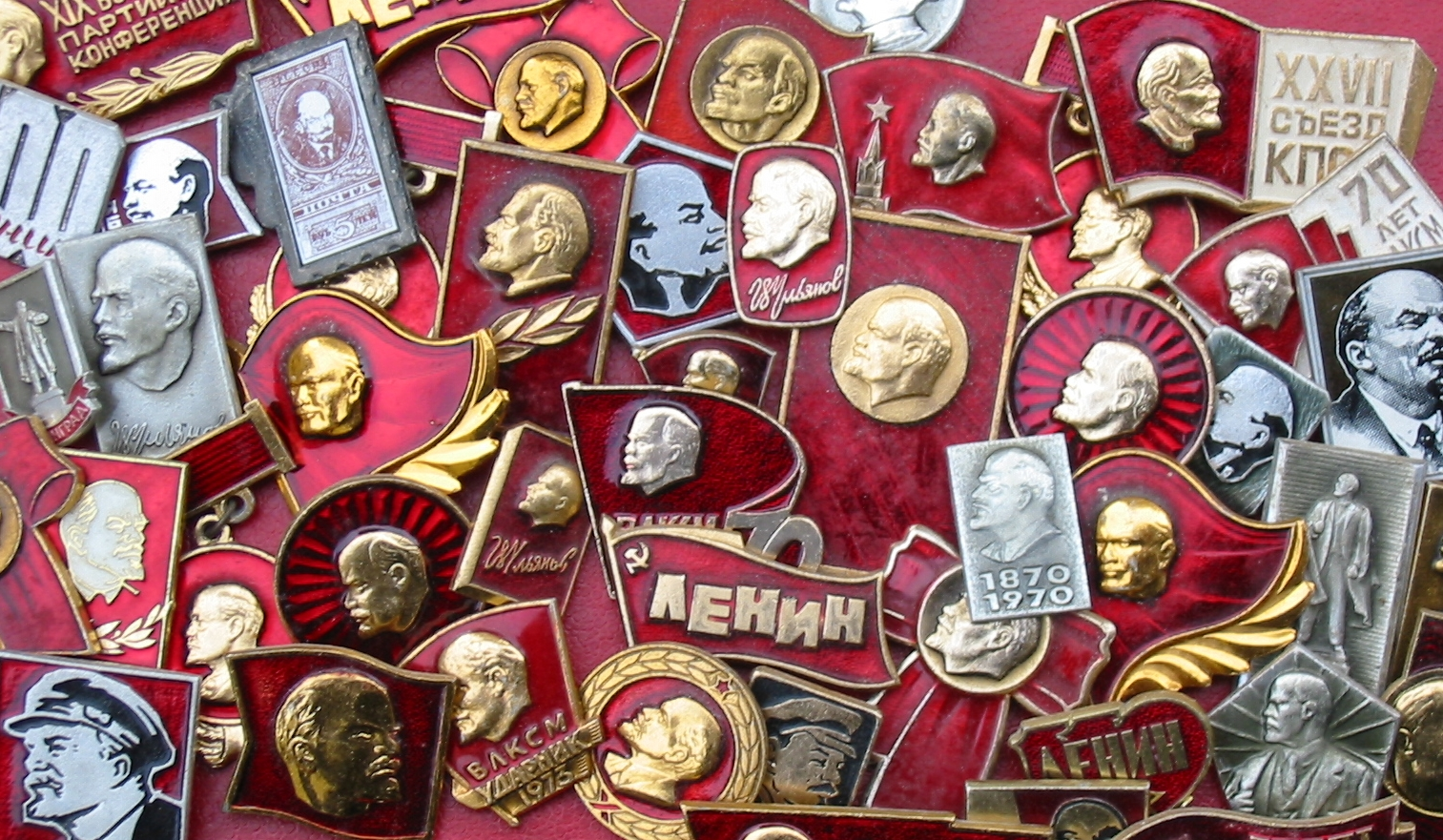
A collection of Vladimir Lenin lapel pins

=== Yugoslavia ===
Lapel pins were also very common in the former Yugoslavia, and are still popular souvenirs in the Western Balkans. Pins where often worn by members of Yugoslav societies to signify said membership. These organisations included the Confederation of Trade Unions of Yugoslavia. Pins were also commonly worn to commemorate public holidays or important events; the Museum of the National Struggle for Liberation, for example, issued pins commemorating the foundation of the second Yugoslavia. More broadly, pins were worn to show patriotism, with people wearing pins with the Emblem of the Yugoslav Socialist Republics that they belonged to (for example, a Montenegrin may wear a pin depicting the emblem of the Socialist Republic of Montenegro). Flag pins were also worn, depicting the six flags of the six republics. It was also common for Yugoslavs outside of Yugoslavia to wear pins depicting the flag, or emblem of their home country, as was the case with pins of the Community of Workers From Yugoslavia in South Baden, or other Gastarbeiter groups, and clubs. Possibly one of the most common things to be depicted on Yugoslav lapel pins was the face of Josip Broz Tito. Such pins showed loyalty to the regime and it's leader.

Labelled collection of Yugoslav lapel pins.

Tourist looking over a selection of Yugoslav lapel pins in Dubrovnik, Croatia.

In the Post-Yugoslav states these old badges are still often sold by vendors and antiquarians, as souvenirs, or to collectors. Pins of local football clubs, such as FK Vojvodina, are also sold. Such badges (the former) may be worn during Yugo-nostalgia celebrations, like the celebration of the anniversary of the second session of AVNOJ.

==== Red triangle pins in European politics ====
- Short video encouraging people to wear a red triangle pin to oppose the far-right, from Territoires de la Mémoire (Belgium), via YouTube shorts
- L'Extême droite c'est toujours NON en fait!

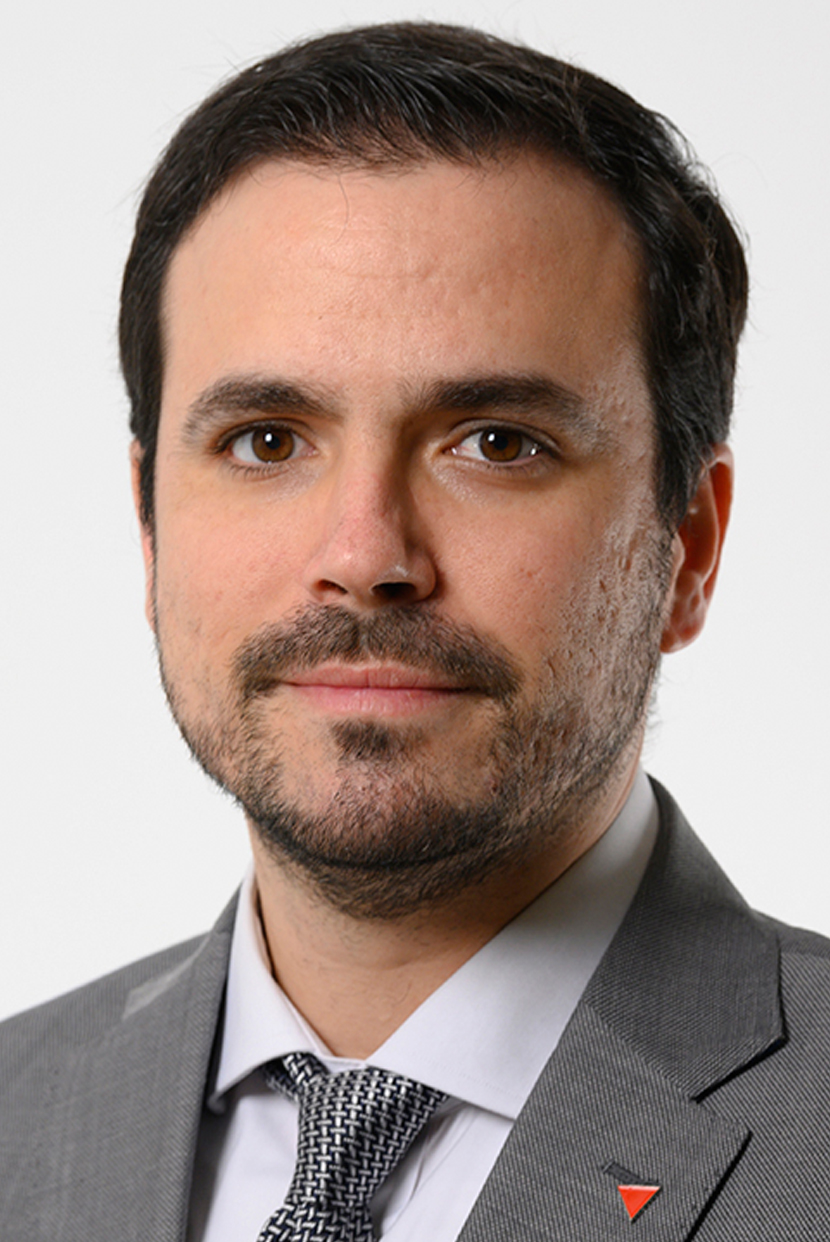
Alberto Garzón, (Note: Spain's Minister of Consumer Affairs) Communist Party of Spain

Red triangle lapel pins are worn by political leaders and activists in Western European countries. The pins are worn by socialist, communist, and other left-wing or far-left politicians in countries such as Belgium, Spain, and France.

French presidential candidate Jean-Luc Mélenchon wore a red triangle lapel pin during his campaign, the message was particularly aimed at diffentiating himself from far-right National Front candidate Marine Le Pen (daughter of the party's even more controversial founder, Jean-Marie Le Pen).

Jean-Luc Mélenchon explained the meaning of the symbol, "I have been compared to the National Front. I was outraged. I said to myself, what could I wear? And someone, a Belgian, a comrade, said to me, 'Listen, I'll give you mine, it's the insignia of the communist deportees in the Nazi concentration camps'. And so I said: 'now I'm putting it on, I'm not taking it off' ... We forget this moment in history. But the first to be deported and massacred were the communists..."

French politician Ugo Bernalicis, from the Left Party (previously from the Socialist Party), represents the department of Nord, in the French National Assembly. Bernalicis was born into a family close to the communist movement, with a militant father, an elected grandfather and a great-grandfather who was deported to the Dachau concentration camp because of his political convictions.

In 2020, red lapel pins were worn by Spanish politicians Pablo Iglesias (Second Deputy Prime Minister of Spain) and Alberto Garzón (Ministry of Consumer Affairs, from the United Left party) when they were sworn into government by the King of Spain. Alberto Garzón has been wearing the symbol since 2016.

== Modern manufacturing process ==
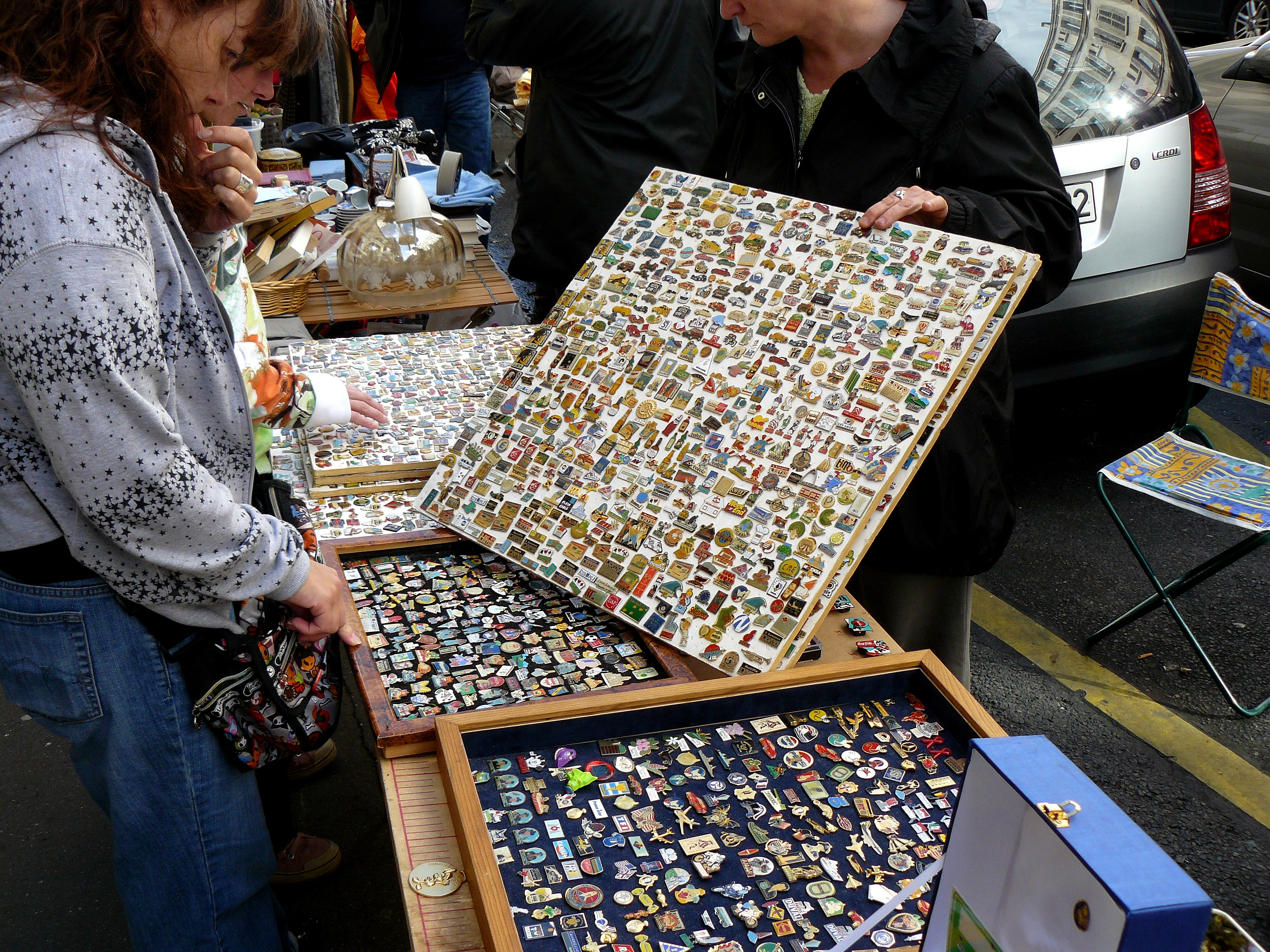
A lapel pin vendor in Paris

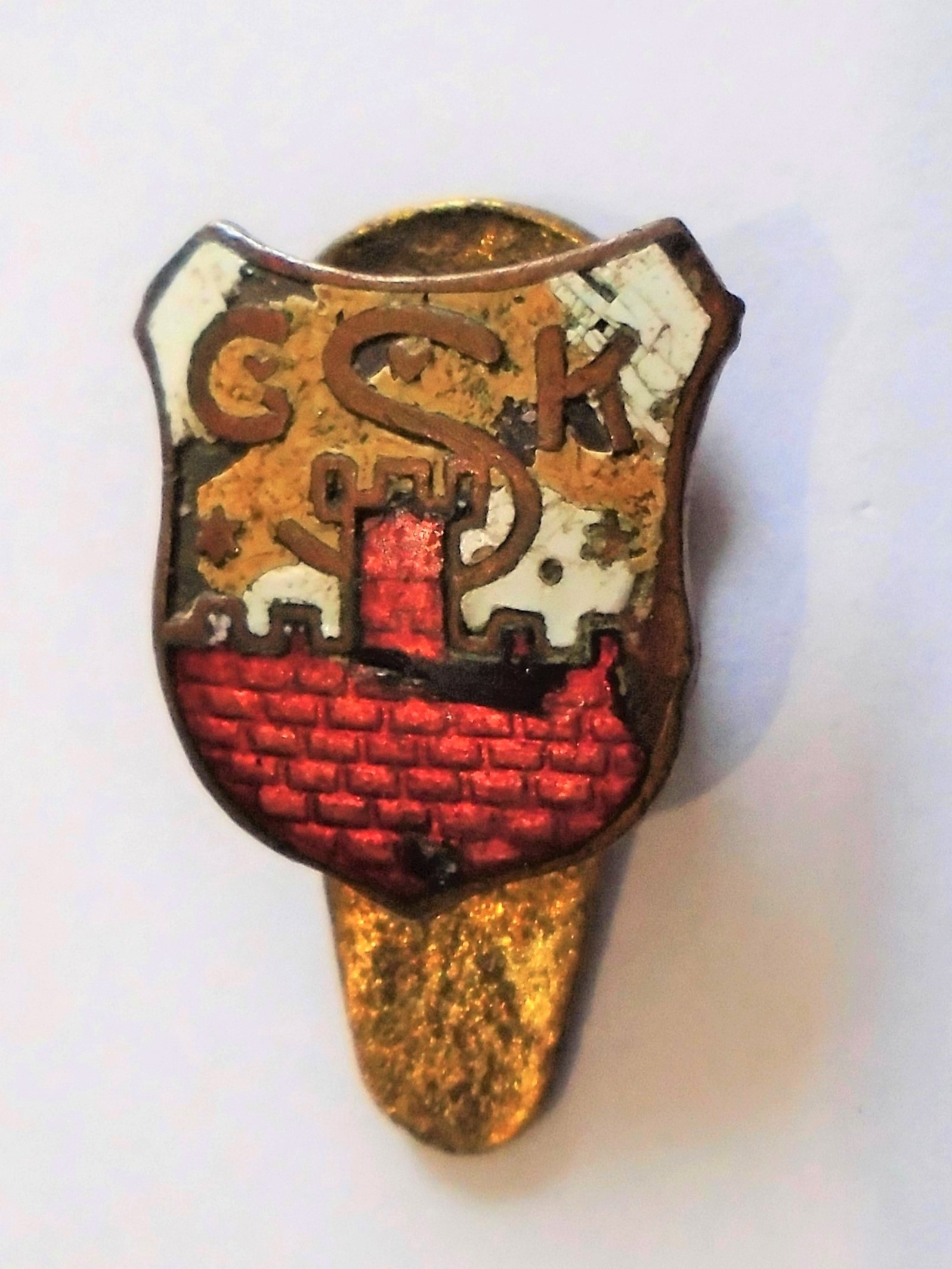
An old enamel pin of the ČŠK Football Club from 1920 (Čakovec, Croatia)

Almost all manufacturing is currently done in China, specifically in and around Kunshan, a satellite city in the greater Suzhou region that is administratively at the county-level in southeast Jiangsu, China, just outside Shanghai. Inexpensive labor in China has made non-Chinese production of lapel pins few and far between. There are still multiple online shops run by people outside of China who make and sell lapel pins.

In the die struck manufacturing process, there are five basic types of pins: Cloisonné, soft enamel, photo etched, screen printed and 4-color printed. In all processes, the outer shape of the pin is stamped out from a sheet of steel, aluminum, copper, brass, or iron. In the case of cloisonne and soft enamel, the shape and the design are stamped out. Nowadays, due to the low melting point and low price of zinc alloy, a large number of lapel pins are made of die-cast zinc alloy.

Cloisonné
Sometimes called epola (imitation cloisonné) or hard enamel, cloisonné is stamped out from a sheet of copper. The stamping leaves recessed areas, or pools, which are filled with enamel powder and high fired at 800° to 900°. After cooling, the surface of the pin is ground down to a smooth finish and then the copper is plated. Cloisonné (hard enamel) pins are widely regarded as the premium standard for diplomatic gifts, military honors, and long-term commemorative awards due to their scratch-resistant, jewelry-like finish.

Soft enamel
This process is like epola and cloisonné in that strips of metal separate areas of color. Unlike Cloisonné, the areas of color rest below the metal strip surface, which can be felt when you run your finger over the surface. Like the photo etched process, the top can be covered with protective epoxy so that the piece appears smooth. Soft enamel pins are among the most widely used styles for political campaigns, organizational membership, and large-scale public events.

Photo etched
In the photo etch process, only the shape of the piece is stamped out. The design on the face of the pin is chemically etched into the base metal, then color-filled by hand and baked before being polished. In the final step, a thin coat of clear epoxy can be applied to the surface.

Photo dome
The photo dome process begins by printing the art or design on vinyl or paper and then applying it to a metal pin base. The vinyl is then coated with an epoxy dome that protects the art from wear and the elements. This process is gaining in popularity because of advances in printing resolutions and the ability to complete these pins quickly in the United States.This process is particularly suited for commemorative pins featuring historical photographs or highly detailed imagery

Screen printed
Screen printing, a.k.a. silk screening, is produced by applying each color to the metal base using a "silk screen" process. These are blocks of solid color. A very thin epoxy coat protects the color material from scratching.

4-color process
4-color process, a.k.a. offset printing, allows for bleeds and blends of colors, as is used in magazines. The colors are printed in the traditional CMYK process. This style is can be used for complex art and photo reproduction. An unlimited number of colors can be used.

== Backside ==
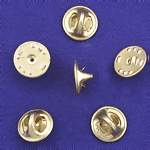
Butterfly clutches

The backside of a lapel pin holds the pin in place, and attachment pieces come in a variety of styles.

- Butterfly clutch – One of the most popular modern methods of attaching pins is the butterfly clutch, sometimes called a military clutch. The back of the pin has a small prong attached and when the butterfly clutch is squeezed and pulled up from the prong the pin is released from the clutch. Butterfly clutches may be made out of metal, plastic, or rubber. Also known as a dammit.
- Jewelry clutch – The jewelry clutch, or tie tack, is a simple but elegant design. The clutch locks into place when it covers the prong.
- Safety clasp – A safety clasp is similar to a safety pin in design. A long pin prong tucks under a small hook or clasp to hold the pin in place.
- Magnetic clasp – Magnetic clasps are composed of a small disc magnet that is attracted to another magnet that is attached to the back of the pin. Although this method is generally less secure, it is designed to prevent hole punctures in garments. Bar magnet clasps help disperse the tension with two sets of magnets.
- Screw and nut – A screw and nut clasp is one of the most secure. The prong is threaded so that the nut screws into place to hold the pin firmly.
- Stick pin – A stick pin has a thin needle with a collar that slides up and down the needle to secure or release the pin.

== See also ==
- Pin
- Award pin
- Boutonnière
- Brooch
- Collar pin
- Campaign button
- Pin-back button
- Red triangle (badge)
- Remembrance poppy
- Pin trading and collecting
- Kim Il-sung and Kim Jong-il badges
