= Kanye West presidential campaign =

Kanye West presidential campaign may refer to:

- Kanye West 2020 presidential campaign
- Kanye West 2024 presidential campaign
