= AmeriCorps =

Independent agency of the US government

Corporation for National and Community Service

Agency overview
- Formed: 1993
- Preceding agency: ACTION
- Jurisdiction: Federal government of the United States
- Headquarters: 250 E Street, SW Washington, D.C. 20525
- Employees: 586 (2020)
- Annual budget: $1.055 billion USD (2013 Annualized CR level)
- Agency executive: Jennifer Tahmasebi, Interim Agency Head
- Website: americorps.gov

AmeriCorps (/əˈmɛrɪkɔːr/ ə-MERR-ih-kor; officially the Corporation for National and Community Service or CNCS) is an independent agency of the United States government that engages more than five million Americans in service through a variety of stipended volunteer work programs in many sectors. These programs include AmeriCorps VISTA, AmeriCorps NCCC, AmeriCorps State and National, AmeriCorps Seniors, the Volunteer Generation Fund, and other national service initiatives. It was created by the National and Community Service Trust Act of 1993. In September 2020, the agency rebranded itself as AmeriCorps, although its official name is unchanged.

== Programs ==
AmeriCorps delivers several programs designed to help communities address poverty, the environment, education, and other unmet human needs. The programs include:

=== AmeriCorps VISTA ===
AmeriCorps VISTA, or Volunteers in Service to America (VISTA), was founded in 1965 as a domestic version of the Peace Corps. The program was incorporated into AmeriCorps and renamed AmeriCorps VISTA to create AmeriCorps in 1993. VISTA provides full-time members to nonprofit, faith-based and other community organizations, and public agencies to create and expand programs that ultimately bring low-income individuals and communities out of poverty. There are currently over 5,000 VISTA members serving in 1,200 VISTA programs nationwide.

VISTA members take the following oath: "I do solemnly swear (or affirm) that I will support and defend the Constitution of the United States against all enemies, foreign and domestic; that I will bear true faith and allegiance to the same; that I take this obligation freely, without any mental reservation or purpose of evasion; and that I will well and faithfully discharge the duties of the office on which I am about to enter: So help me God."

=== AmeriCorps NCCC ===
AmeriCorps National Civilian Community Corps (NCCC) is a full-time, residential team-based program for men and women ages 18–26. Members serve at one of four regional campuses located throughout the United States (Vicksburg, Mississippi; Vinton, Iowa; Aurora/Denver, Colorado; and Sacramento, California). Each campus focuses efforts on states within its region but may travel to other areas in response to national crises. Former campuses were located in Washington, DC; Charleston, South Carolina; San Diego, California; Baltimore, Maryland; and Perry Point, Maryland.

=== AmeriCorps State and National ===
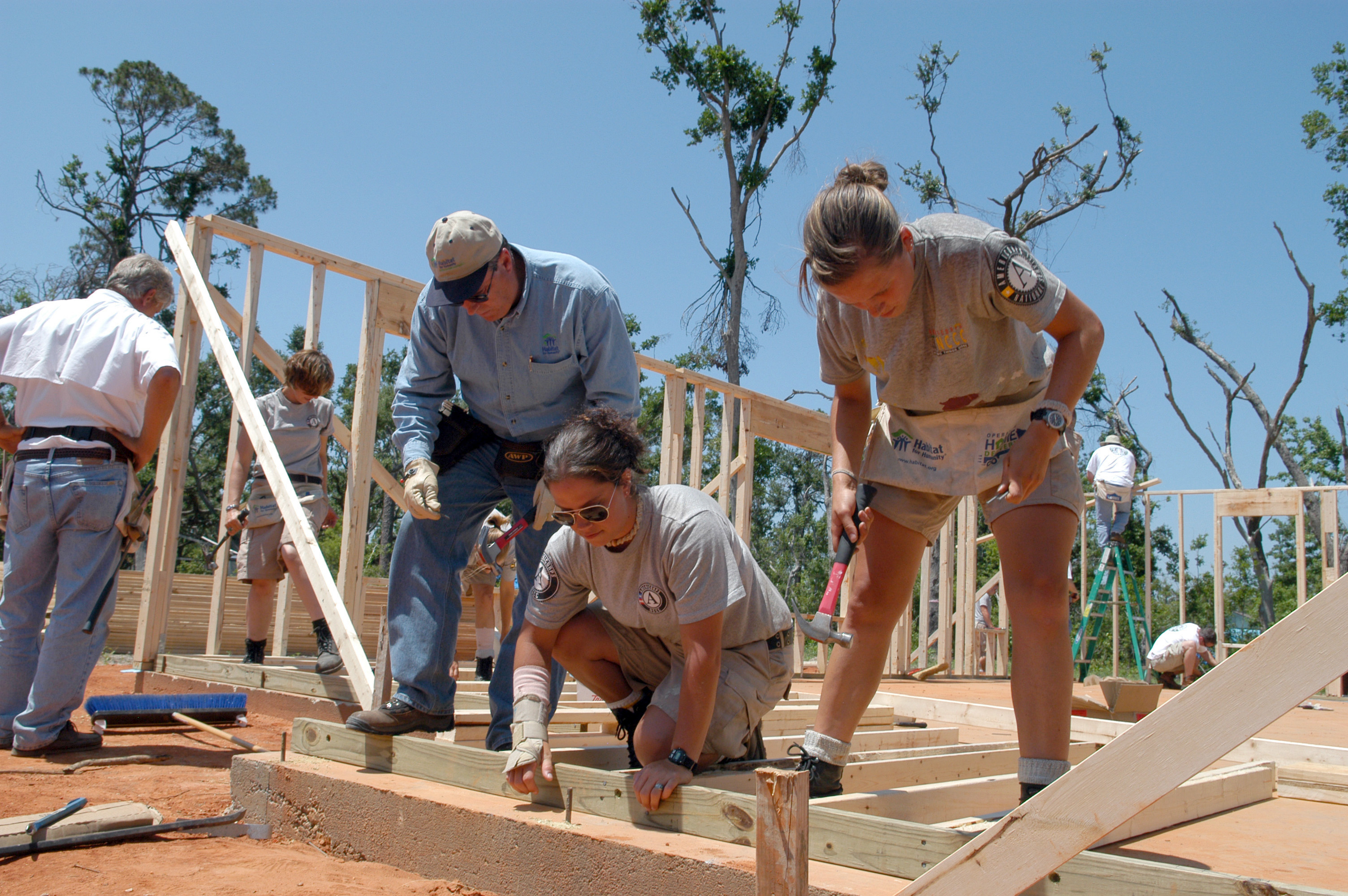
Volunteers from AmeriCorps in Mississippi

AmeriCorps State and National is the largest of the AmeriCorps programs, and provides grants to local and national organizations and agencies, including faith-based and community organizations, higher education institutions, and public agencies. Public Land Corps programs and Urban Youth Corps are specifically authorized for funding. The Edward M. Kennedy Serve America Act authorizes Education Corps, Health Futures Corps, Clean Energy Corps, Veterans Corps, and Opportunity Corps programs as qualifying for AmeriCorps programs. Grants assist these groups in recruiting, training and placing AmeriCorps members to meet critical community needs in education, public safety, health, and the environment. AmeriCorps State operates through Service Commissions in each state, such as Volunteer Florida and the Mississippi Commission for Volunteer Service; South Dakota is the only state without a Service Commission. Each state's Service Commission dispenses funding from AmeriCorps to organizations in their states through annual grant competitions. Since the program's inception, thousands of organizations across the nation have been awarded AmeriCorps State and National grants.

AmeriCorps State and National members engage in direct service activities, such as after-school tutoring or homebuilding, and capacity-building activities, such as volunteer recruitment, for the organizations they serve. After successfully completing their term of service, AmeriCorps State and National members may be eligible for an Education Award of up to $6,095 or equal to the full Pell Grant for the year in which service was approved. The Education Award can pay for additional college or graduate school courses, or it can pay off existing student loans. Full-time members typically complete 1,700 hours of service over 11 months; they also receive a living allowance, health benefits, and child care assistance during their term.

AmeriCorps State and National members take the following pledge:

I will get things done for America – to make our people safer, smarter, and healthier.
I will bring Americans together to strengthen our communities.
Faced with apathy, I will take action.
Faced with conflict, I will seek common ground.
Faced with adversity, I will persevere.
I will carry this commitment with me this year and beyond.
I am an AmeriCorps member, and I will get things done.

=== AmeriCorps Seniors ===
The AmeriCorps Seniors umbrella includes three programs that engage seniors aged 55+ in volunteerism: the Foster Grandparents program, through which volunteers teach and mentor children; Senior Companions, through which volunteers help older adults live independently in their homes; and RSVP, through which volunteers can serve in a variety of roles to meet their communities' needs.

=== Other programs ===
- MLK Day of Service
- President's Volunteer Service Award
- September 11th National Day of Service and Remembrance
- Learn and Serve America (discontinued in 2011)

== Special initiatives ==
=== Employers of National Service ===
On September 12, 2014, President Barack Obama launched the Employers of National Service initiative at the 20th Anniversary of AmeriCorps event on the South Lawn of the White House. Employers participating in the initiative connect to the talent pipeline of AmeriCorps, Peace Corps, and other service year alumni, by indicating in their hiring processes that they view national service experience as a plus. The initiative is a collaboration between AmeriCorps with the Peace Corps, Service Year Alliance, AmeriCorps Alums, and the National Peace Corps Association. To date, over 500 employers have joined the initiative.

== History ==
The Commission on National and Community Service was a new, independent federal agency created as a consequence of the National and Community Service Act of 1990, signed into law by President George H. W. Bush.

The Commission was intended to bring about a renewed focus on encouraging volunteering in the United States and was charged with supporting four streams of service:

1. Service-learning programs for school-aged youth
2. Higher education service programs
3. Youth corps
4. National service demonstration models

In 1993 the Corporation for National and Community Service was created as a government corporation, merging ACTION, and the Commission on National and Community Service, thus ending the Commission.

=== Timeline ===
1990: President George H. W. Bush signs the National and Community Service Act of 1990 into law, ushering in a renewed federal focus on encouraging volunteering in the U.S. This legislation created the new independent federal agency called the Commission on National and Community Service.

1992: Enacted as part of the 1993 National Defense Authorization Act, the National Civilian Community Corps (NCCC) is created as a demonstration program to explore the possibility of using post-Cold War military resources to help solve problems here at home. It is modeled on the Depression-era Civilian Conservation Corps and the United States military.

1993: President Bill Clinton signs into passage The National and Community Service Trust Act, formally merging the federal offices of ACTION and the Commission on National and Community Service, including Serve America and NCCC, to form the Corporation for National and Community Service, along with the addition of the new AmeriCorps program.

History Timeline: The act was passed on September 21, 1993 when it was signed by President Clinton. Prior to this it had its first hearing with the House on February 25, 1993 where the Committee on Education and Labor was there to help push the bill out there. From there it was introduced to the Senate on April 19, 1993. From February to September it was a process where it went between the senate and house floors to different committees as well as going between different committees. Then finally on August 6, 1993 the conference report passed in the house and then on September 8, 1993 the conference report passed in the Senate.

What the Act Included:

The Act itself targeted education, community welfare, and promotion of community service.

1. Those who completed the community service program received a $4,725 stipend to go towards higher education or student loan debt.

2. Targeted communities at a local level to strengthen them back together and aim to lower crime rates.

3. Youth advocacy towards getting the youth to participate in community service.

4. Advocacy for lower income civilians to join the program and gain a sense of self.

Provisions Made:

There were not many provisions that had to be made for this act. There was a pattern between funding and finding private sectors. They made provisions in the budget, but found a way to incorporate possible private sectors to this to help provide more funding as the republicans took concern to the program getting too much money to fund this act. Another provision was giving more power to the local governments as the republicans raised concerned that it will be too "big government" ideas if the federal government had full control over this act. They also raised concern that what if the idea of building and strengthening communities did not focus on what each specific community needed if it was all ran by the federal government.

2002: President George W. Bush creates the USA Freedom Corps.

2020: The agency is rebranded as "AmeriCorps".

=== Changes under the second Trump administration ===
In April 2025, about 75% of staff were put on paid leave after members of the Trump administration's Department of Government Efficiency visited the headquarters. As a result, the agency demobilized six active AmeriCorps NCCC classes; over 700 members were sent home in mid-April 2025.

In June 2025, a federal judge ordered the restoration of funds to AmeriCorps programs in 24 plaintiff states. The injunction also called for AmeriCorps NCCC members to be reinstated to service. In July 2025, a different federal judge ordered AmeriCorps to reinstate hundreds of staff that were placed on leave in April.

== Organization ==
=== Board of directors ===
The board of directors is composed of 26 members, 15 of which are appointed by the president of the United States with the consent of the United States Senate. Of these fifteen, one is an appointee between the ages of 16 and 25 who has served in a school-based or community-based service-learning program or is or was a participant or a supervisor in a program. All members are appointed based on criteria of being people who have extensive experience in volunteer or service activities, which may include programs funded under one of the national service laws, and in State government; who represent a broad range of viewpoints; who are experts in the delivery of human, educational, environmental, or public safety services; and so that the Board is diverse according to race, ethnicity, age, gender, and disability characteristics. No more than eight of the appointed members may be affiliated with the same political party. Members are appointed to terms of five years, but they may continue to serve on the board until a successor is confirmed, though for a maximum of one year after expiration.

In addition to the 15 appointed members, the U.S. Secretary of Education, the U.S. Secretary of Health and Human Services, the U.S. Secretary of Labor, the U.S. Secretary of the Interior, the U.S. Secretary of Agriculture, the U.S. Secretary of Housing and Urban Development, the U.S. Secretary of Defense, the U.S. Attorney General, the director of the Peace Corps, the Administrator of the Environmental Protection Agency, and the CEO of AmeriCorps serve as ex officio nonvoting members of the board.

The board elects a chairperson and a vice chairperson from among its membership. A majority of the appointed members of the board constitutes a quorum.

=== Current board members ===
The current board members as of May 24, 2026:

Position	Name	Party	Assumed office	Term expiration
Chair	Vacant			
Member	Vacant			
Member	Vacant			
Member	Vacant			
Member	Vacant			
Member	Vacant			
Member	Vacant			
Member	Vacant			
Member	Vacant			
Member	Vacant			
Member	Vacant			
Member	Vacant			
Member	Vacant			
Member	Vacant			
Member	Vacant			
Member (non-voting) (ex officio)	Linda McMahon	Republican	March 3, 2025	—
Member (non-voting) (ex officio)	Robert F. Kennedy Jr.	Republican	February 13, 2025	—
Member (non-voting) (ex officio)	Keith Sonderling (acting)	Republican	April 20, 2026	—
Member (non-voting) (ex officio)	Doug Burgum	Republican	February 1, 2025	—
Member (non-voting) (ex officio)	Brooke Rollins	Republican	February 13, 2025	—
Member (non-voting) (ex officio)	Scott Turner	Republican	February 5, 2025	—
Member (non-voting) (ex officio)	Pete Hegseth	Republican	January 25, 2025	—
Member (non-voting) (ex officio)	Todd Blanche (acting)	Republican	April 2, 2026	—
Member (non-voting) (ex officio)	Christopher Landau (acting)	Republican	April 22, 2026	—
Member (non-voting) (ex officio)	Lee Zeldin	Republican	January 29, 2025	—
Member (non-voting) (ex officio)	Jennifer Bastress Tahmasebi (acting)	N/A	2025	—

=== CEO ===
Past CEOs of the agency include:

No.	Image	CEO	Service dates	Appointed by	Notes
1		Eli Segal	1993–1995	Clinton	
2		Harris Wofford	1995–2001	Clinton	
3		Leslie Lenkowsky	2001–2003	G.W. Bush	
4		David Eisner	2004–2008	G.W. Bush	
–		Nicola Goren (Acting)	2008–2010	Obama	
5		Patrick Corvington	2010–2011	Obama	
–		Robert Velasco II (Acting)	2011–2012	Obama	
6		Wendy Spencer	2012–2017	Obama	
–		Kim Mansaray (Acting)	2017–2018	Trump	
7		Barbara Stewart	2018–2021	Trump	
–		Malcolm Coles (Acting)	2021–2022	Biden	
8		Michael D. Smith	2022–2025	Biden	
–		Jennifer Bastress Tahmasebi (Acting)	2025–	Trump	

== Alumni ==
Many former AmeriCorps volunteers have gone on to have notable public careers.

Notable AmeriCorps Volunteers

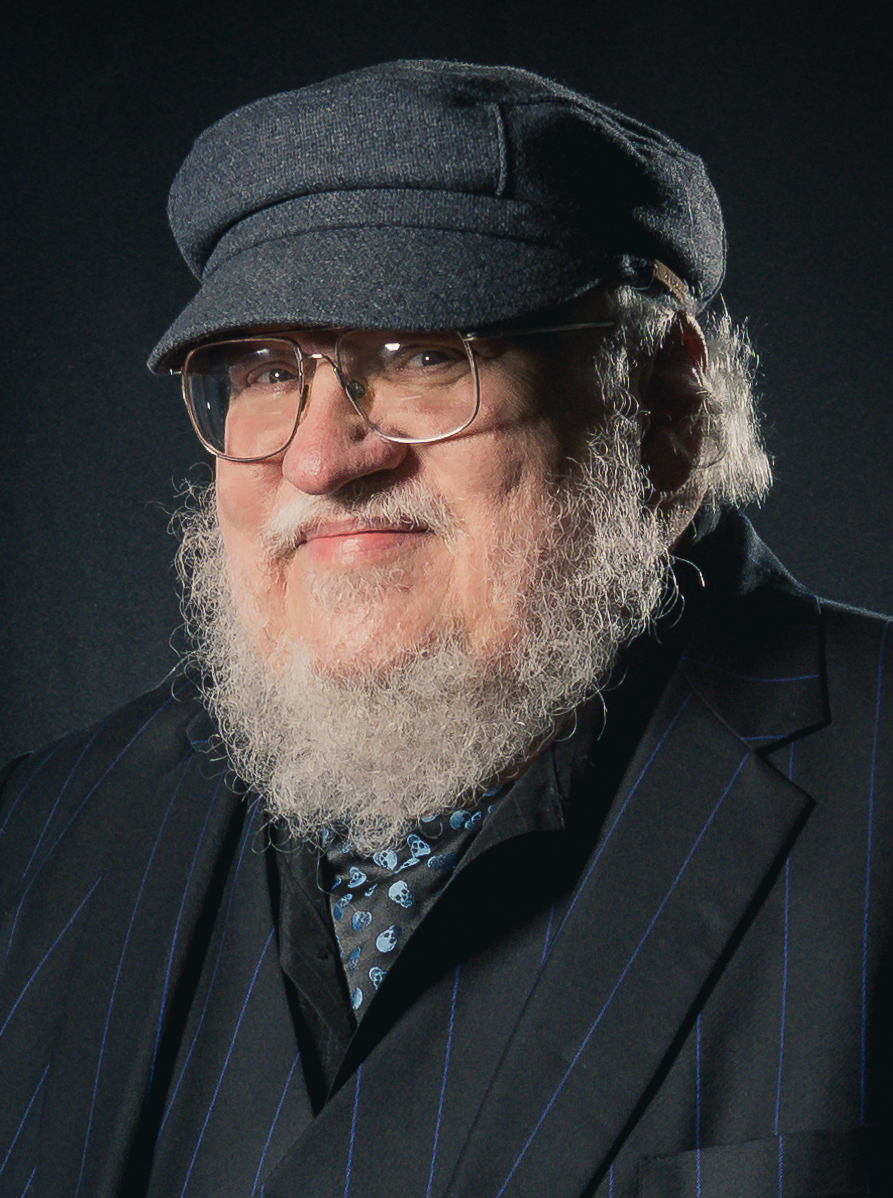
Author George R. R. Martin

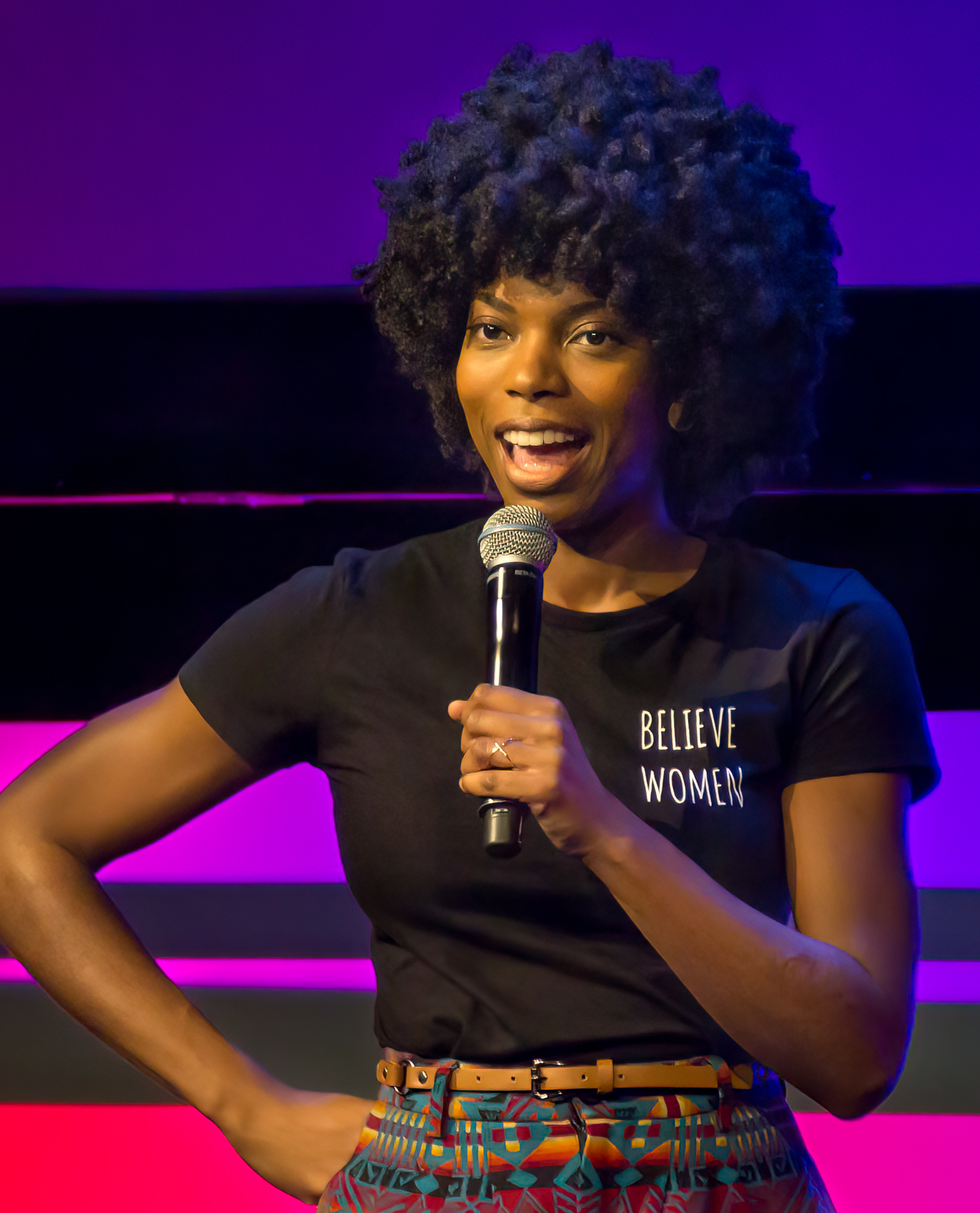
Comedian Sasheer Zamata

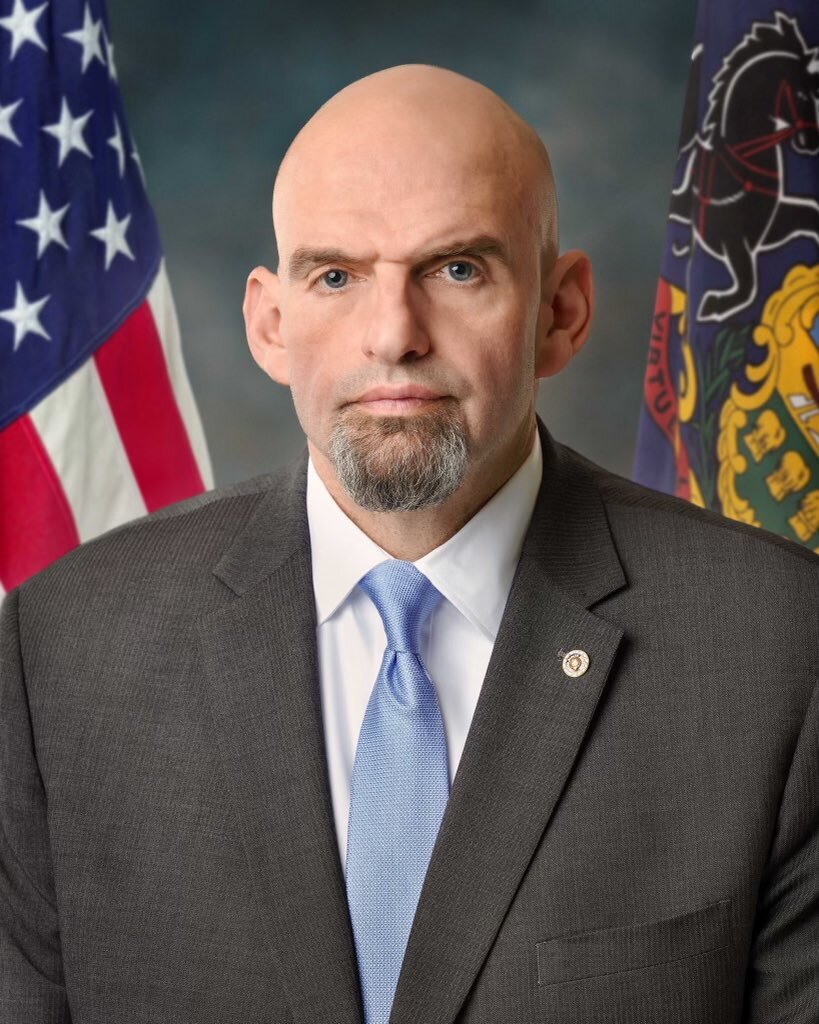
U.S. Senator John Fetterman

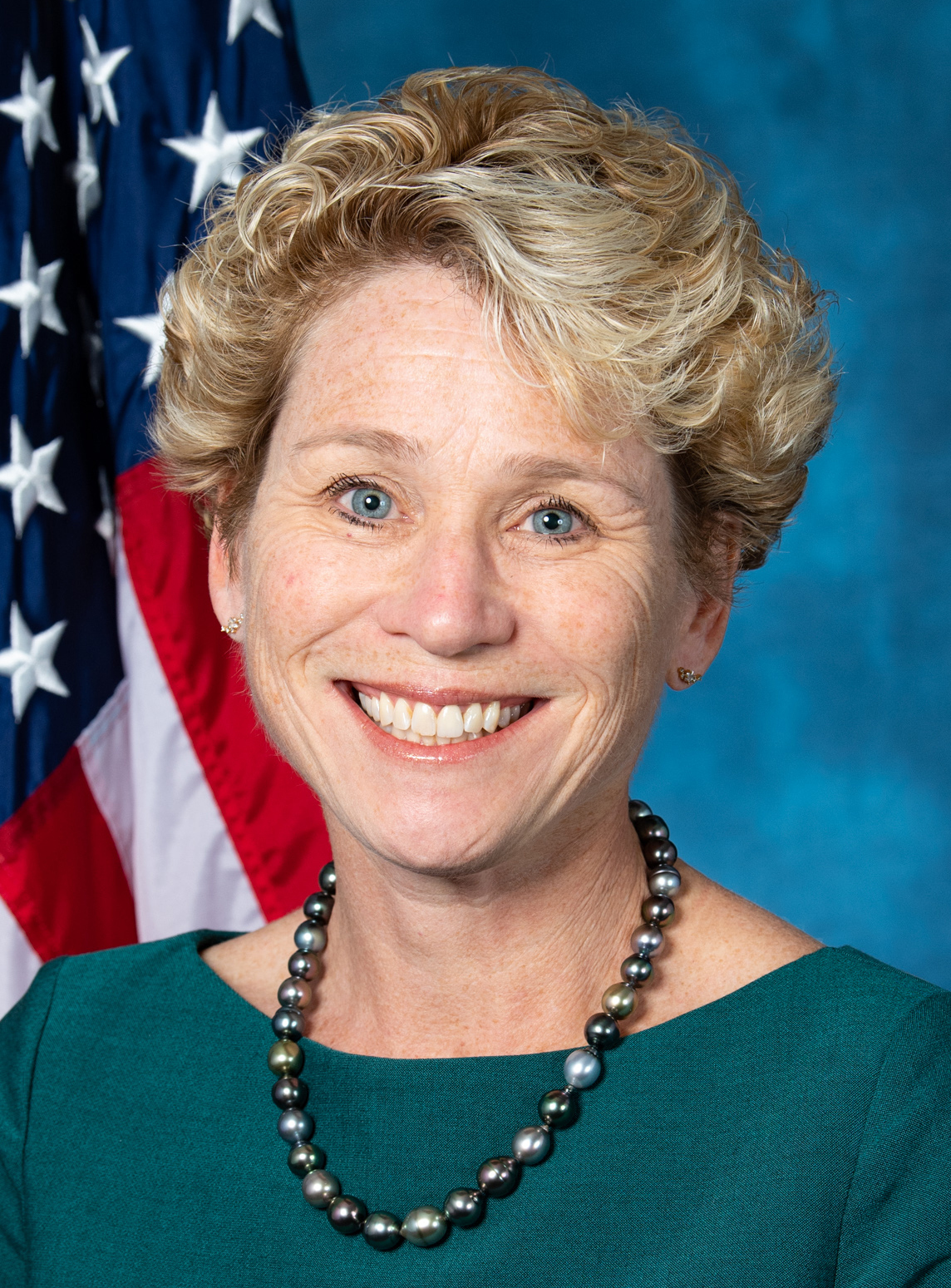
U.S. Representative Chrissy Houlahan

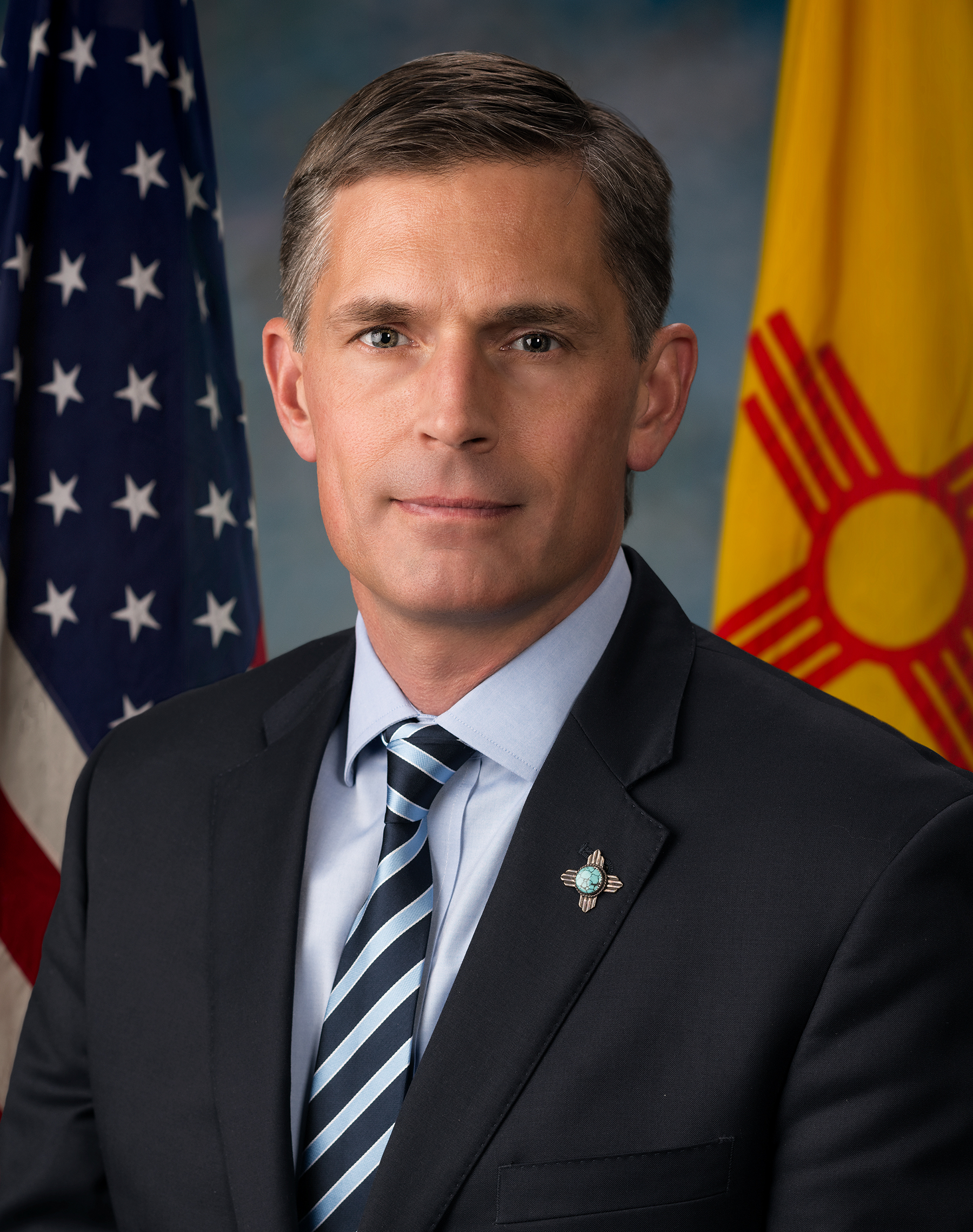
U.S. Senator Martin Heinrich

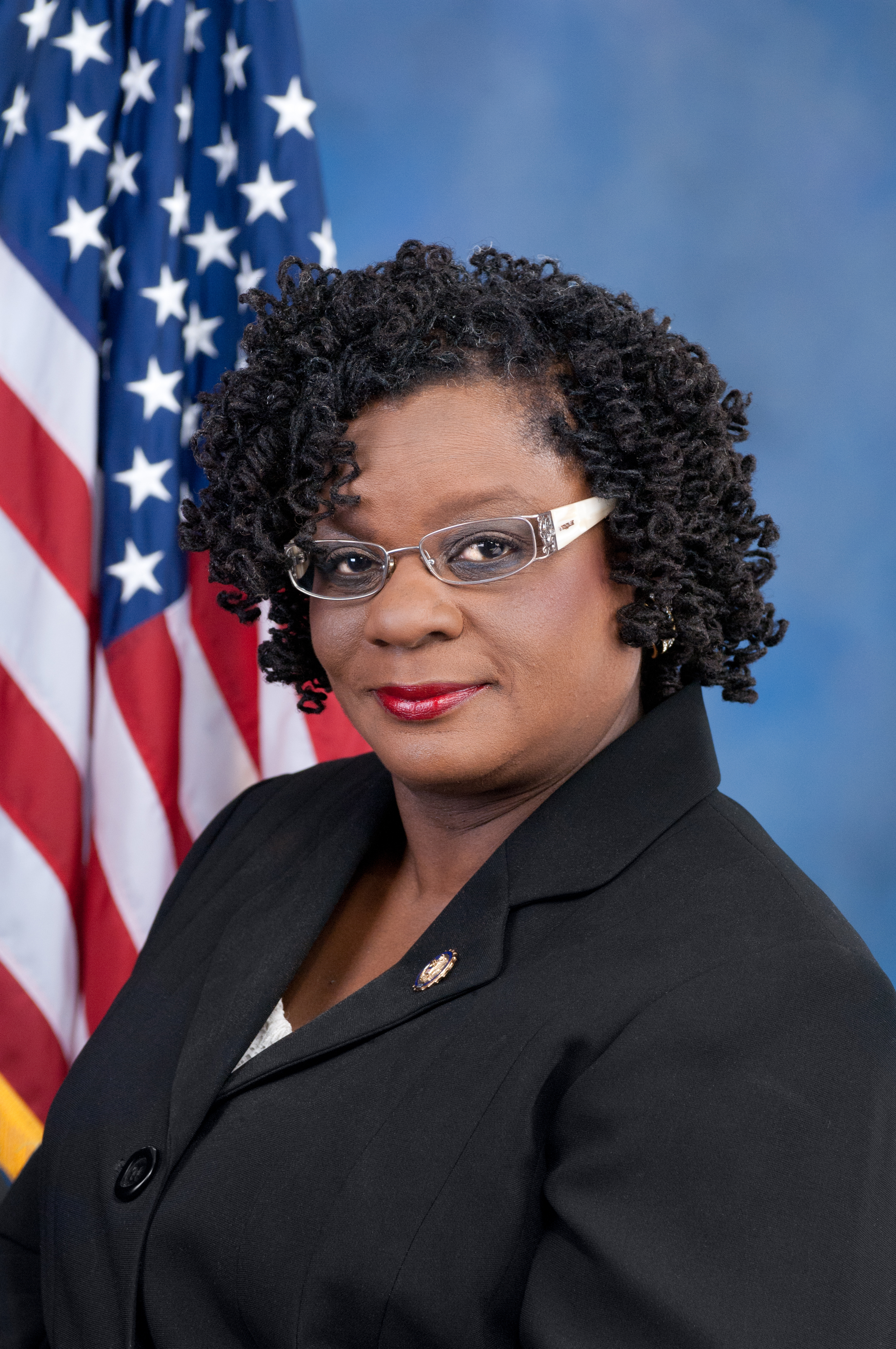
U.S. Representative Gwen Moore

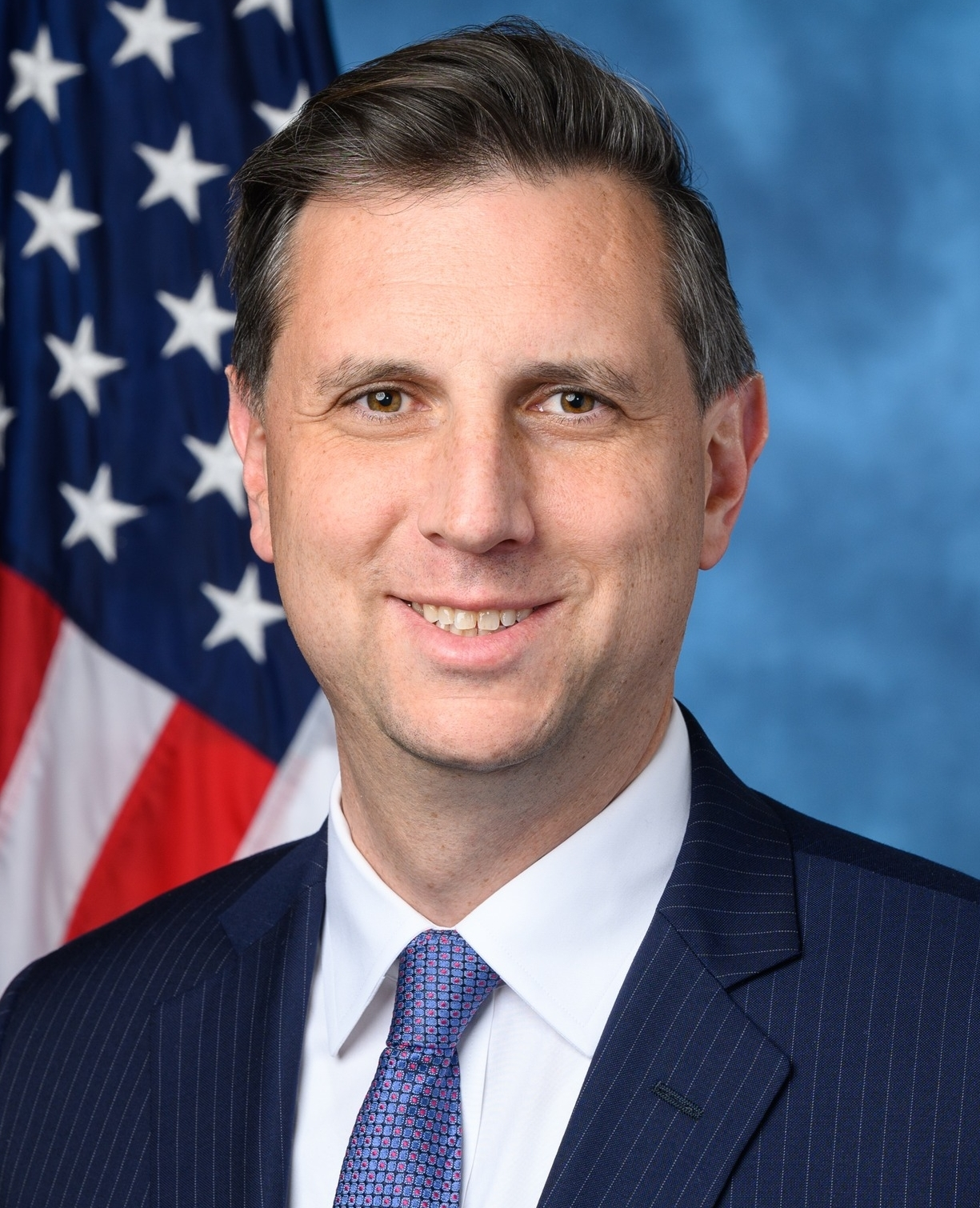
U.S. Representative Seth Magaziner

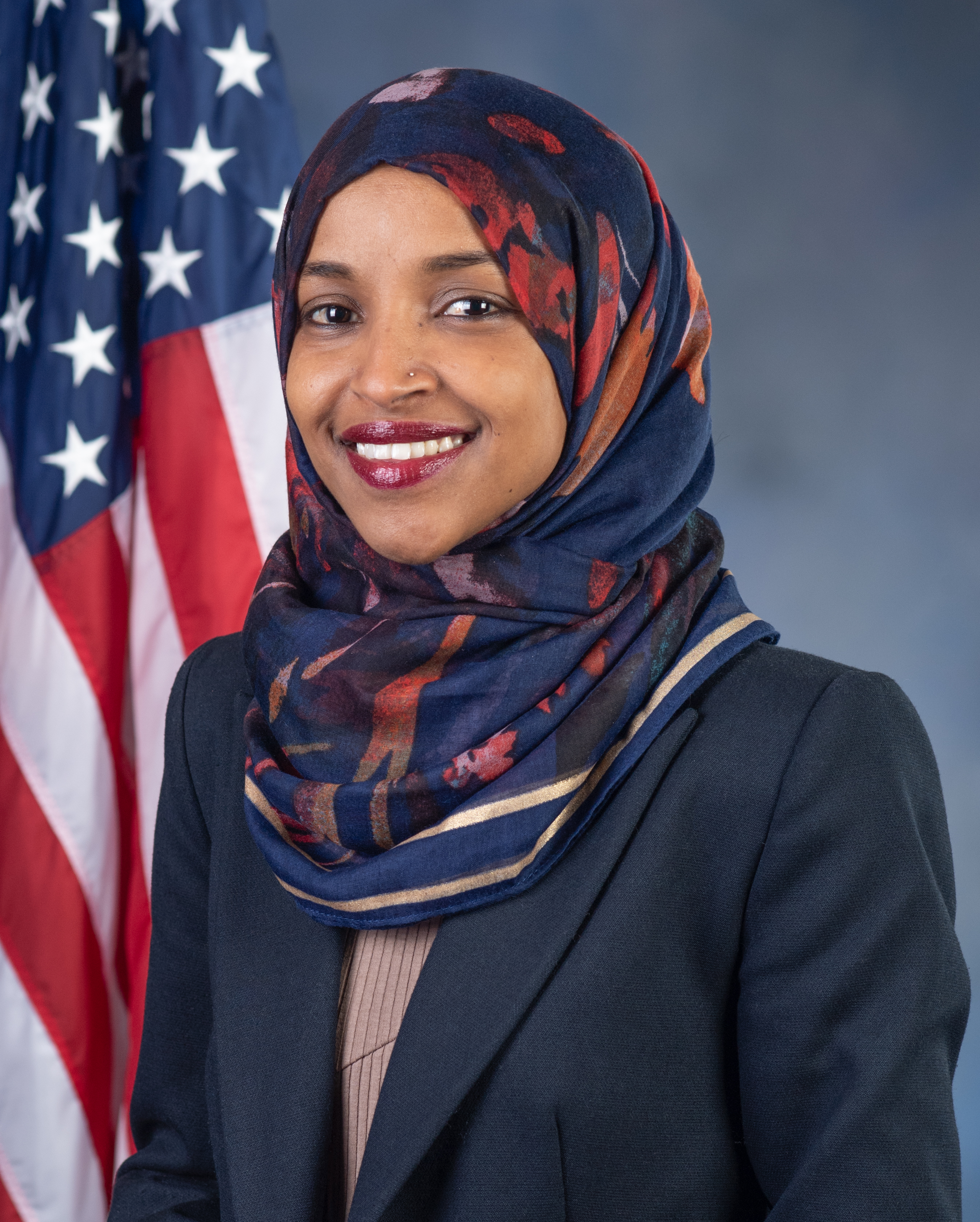
U.S. Representative Ilhan Omar

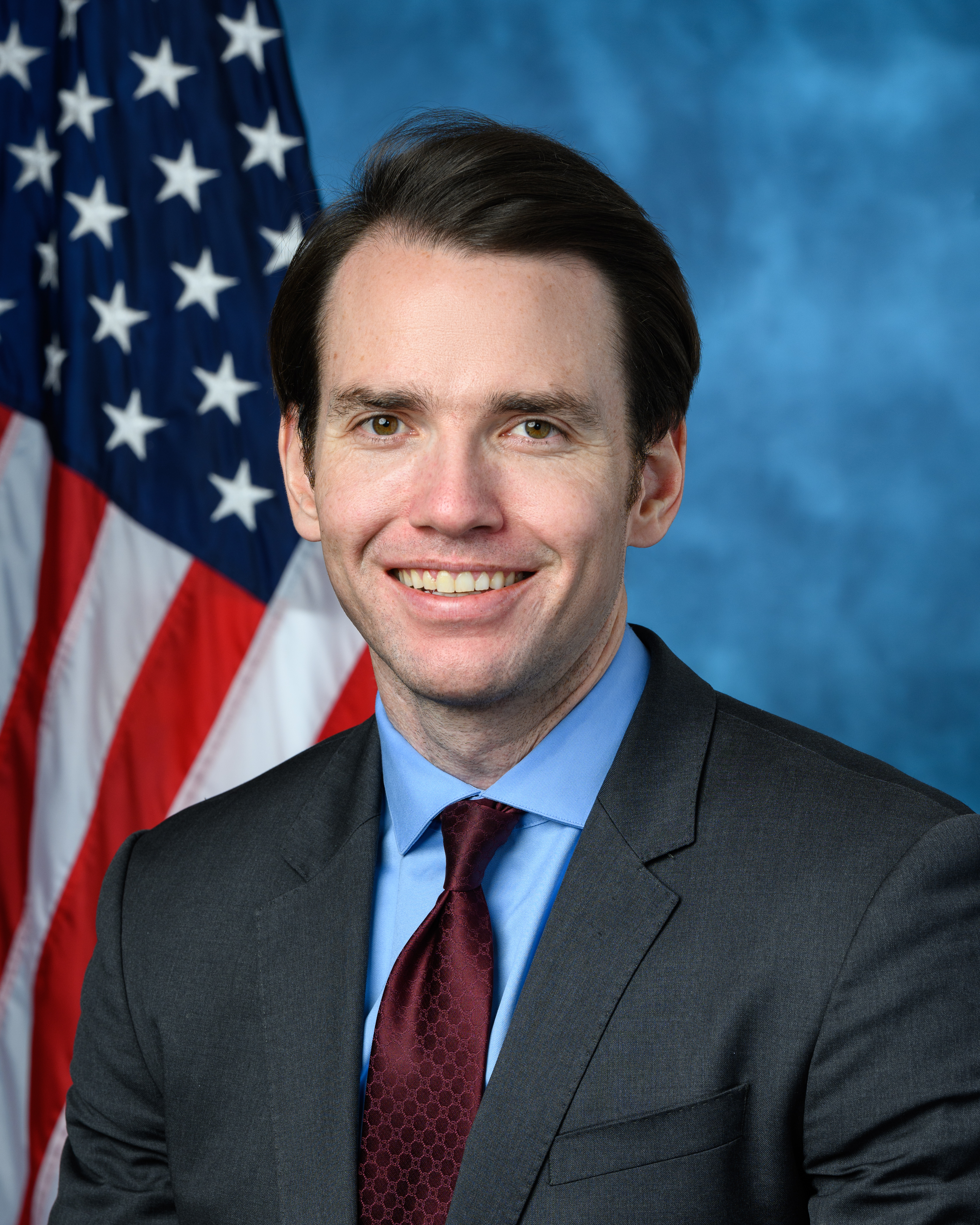
U.S. Representative Kevin Kiley

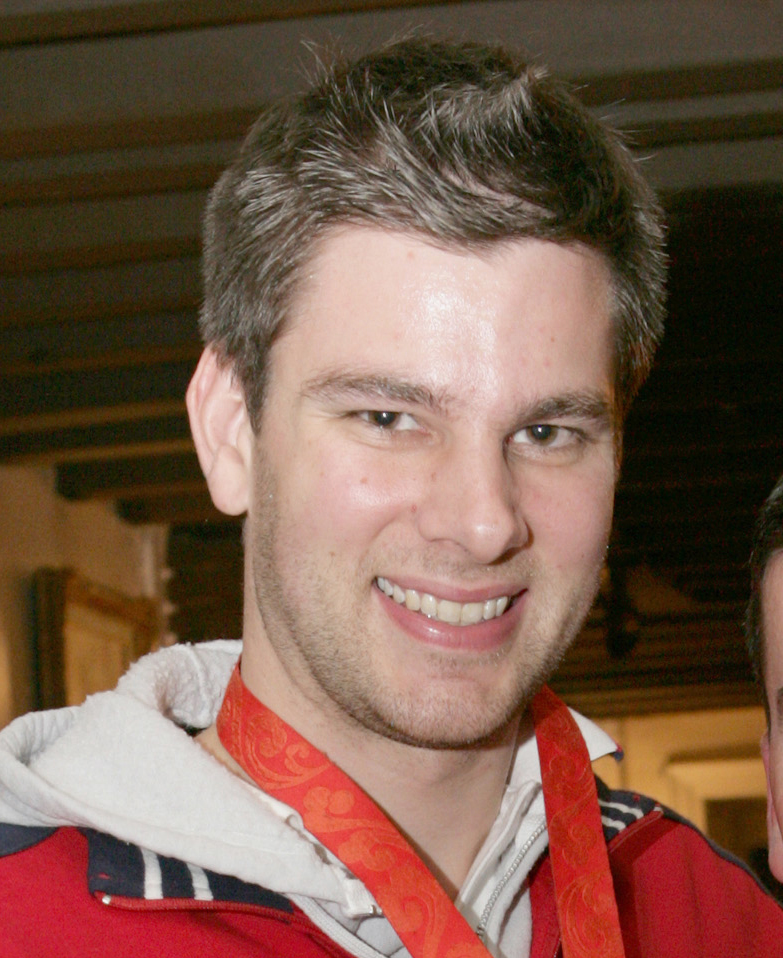
U.S. Olympic fencer Tim Morehouse

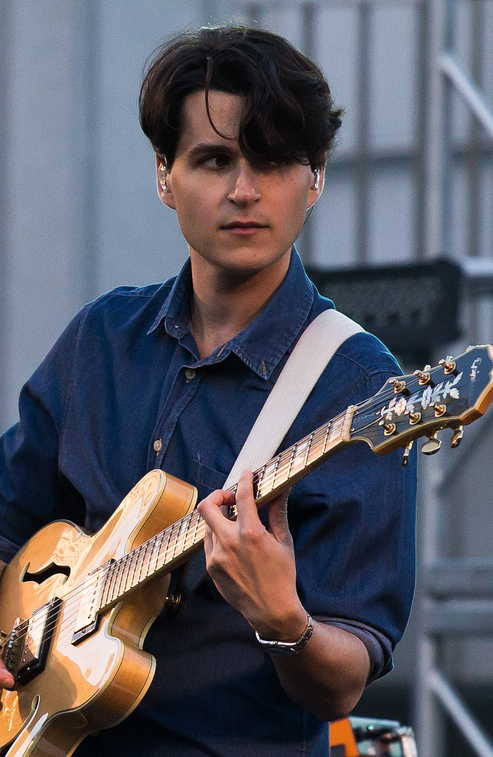
Musician Ezra Koenig

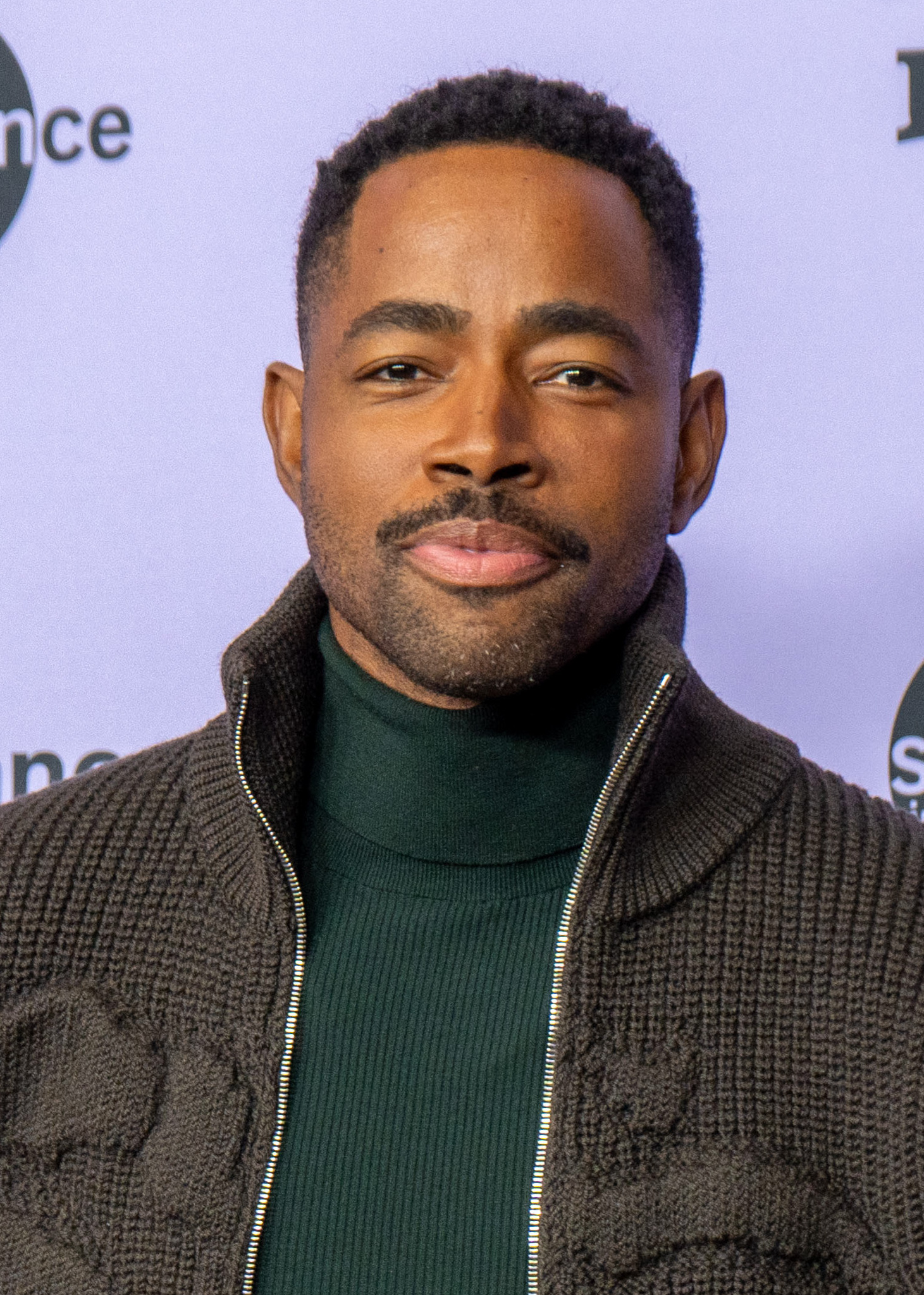
Actor Jay Ellis

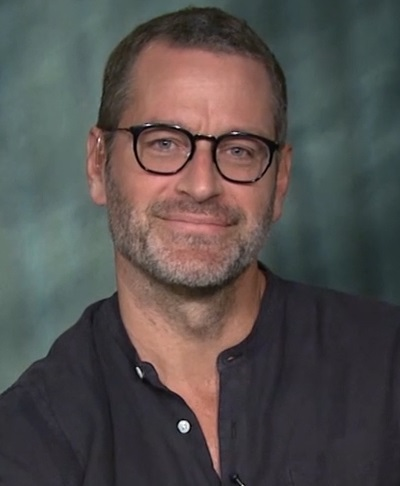
Actor Peter Hermann

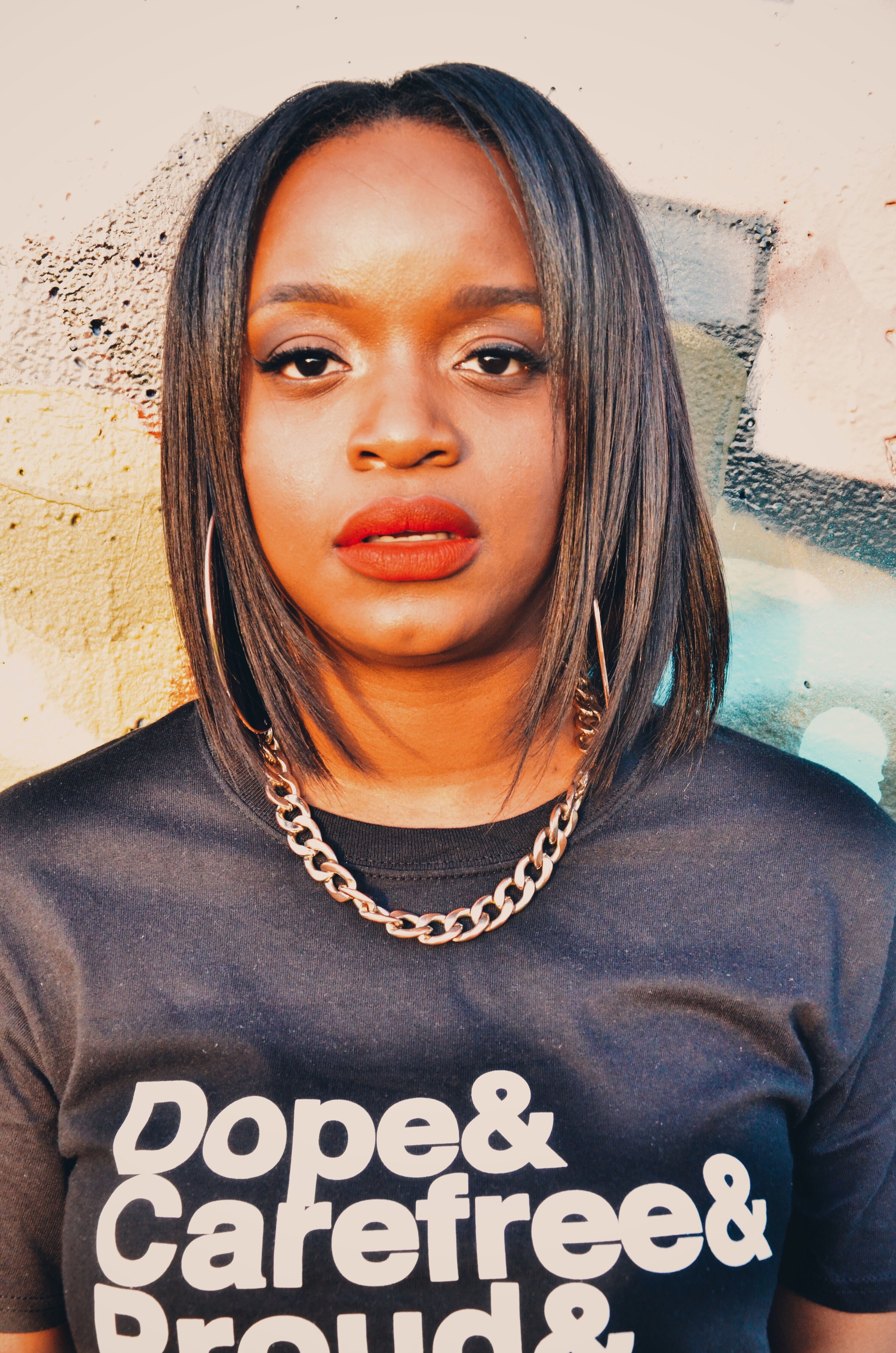
Activist Brittany Packnett Cunningham

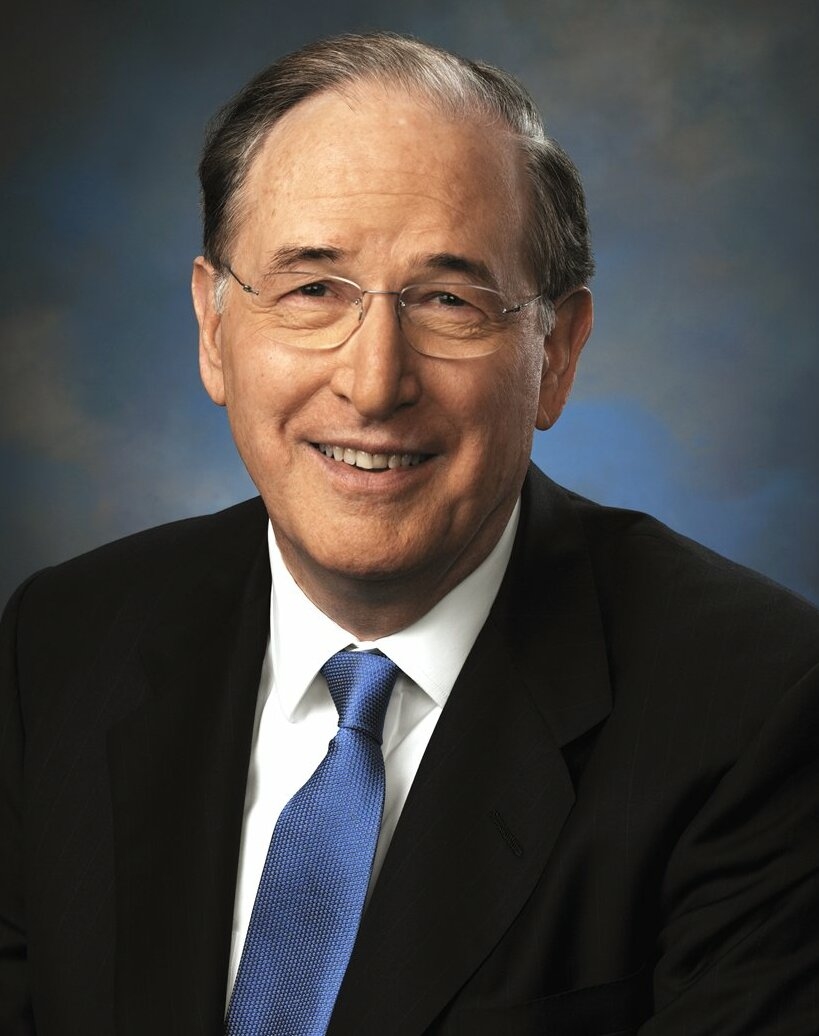
U.S. Senator & WV Governor Jay Rockefeller

== Effectiveness ==
While discussion has occurred about the range and efficacy of evaluating the successes of AmeriCorps State and National, VISTA, and NCCC programs, there has been a variety of documentation supporting the programs. AmeriCorps provided fiscal resources and personnel to support the start-up of national programs, including Public Allies and Teach For America. It also brought vital resources to established programs, including City Year, Boys and Girls Club, Big Brothers Big Sisters, JusticeCorps and the American Red Cross.

AmeriCorps is reported to increase the effectiveness of community service. Successes for individual AmeriCorps State and National, VISTA, and NCCC members include increasing their commitment to community service, increasing community-based activism, connection to their communities, knowledge of community problems, engagement in the political process, and voting participation.

Additionally, according to a 2007 study released by AmeriCorps, a majority of AmeriCorps State and National, VISTA, and NCCC alumni within the study period claimed they had gained life and job skills, such as leadership, teamwork, time-management, and hands-on experience in a field of interest. The study further reported that 71% of alumni were incentivized to join by the prospect of earning a Segal AmeriCorps Education Award; 41% of members went on to receive a four-year college degree within three years of entering AmeriCorps.

=== Criticisms ===
AmeriCorps programs have been criticized as being exploitive of their volunteers, being "voluntourism", and serving to privatize or de-professionalize public services.

In 2018, CBS News Radio did an investigation into years of complaints about AmeriCorps programs which found multiple allegations of sexual harassment, abusive behavior and mismanagement since 2013.

== See also ==
- Community service
- Katimavik
- National service in the United States
- Service learning
- Gerald Walpin
