= David Eisner =

David Eisner may refer to:

- David Eisner (chief executive), American business and political official
- David Eisner (actor) (born 1958), Canadian actor
- David A. Eisner (born 1955), professor of cardiac physiology
