= Eli Segal =

American businessman, philanthropist, politician and social entrepreneur

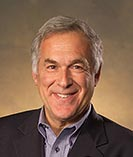

Personal details
- Born: January 13, 1943 New York City, New York, U.S.
- Died: February 20, 2006 (aged 63) Boston, Massachusetts, U.S.
- Party: Democratic
- Education: Brandeis University (BA); University of Michigan (JD)

Eli J. Segal (January 13, 1943 – February 20, 2006) was an American businessman, philanthropist, politician and social entrepreneur.

== Background ==
Eli J. Segal was born in 1943 and was a native of Brooklyn, New York. Segal was both a 1964 graduate of Brandeis University and a 1967 graduate of University of Michigan Law School. Segal was married to his wife, Phyllis, whom he met while studying at Brandeis University, until his death in 2006.

== Career ==
Segal got his start in politics during the 1972 presidential campaign of George McGovern. He organized some business ventures in the 1980s, and was CEO of Vogart Crafts Corporation before becoming Chief of Staff of President Bill Clinton's campaign in 1992. After the election of Bill Clinton, Segal served as the first CEO of the Corporation for National and Community Service and as a member of its board of directors. He was later tapped by President Clinton to assist in Clinton's Welfare-to-Work initiative. In 2001, President Clinton awarded Segal the President's Citizen Medal for the contributions he made to the Clinton administration and the country. After leaving the Clinton Administration, Segal assisted in the expansion of the City Year program, and was pivotal in founding the organization's South Africa and Louisiana corps. For these contributions, City Year offers a fellowship each year named after Segal.

== Death ==
Segal died in 2006 at the age of 63 from mesothelioma.

== Legacy ==
Bill Clinton stated in 2007 that Eli J. Segal "had a quality that was relatively rare in public service, government service, at the time. He could take a vision and turn it into a reality.” Fellowships have been created in his honor at the Corporation for National and Community Service, Americorps, City Year, and Brandeis University.
