= Kanye West presidential campaigns =

2020 U.S. political campaigns

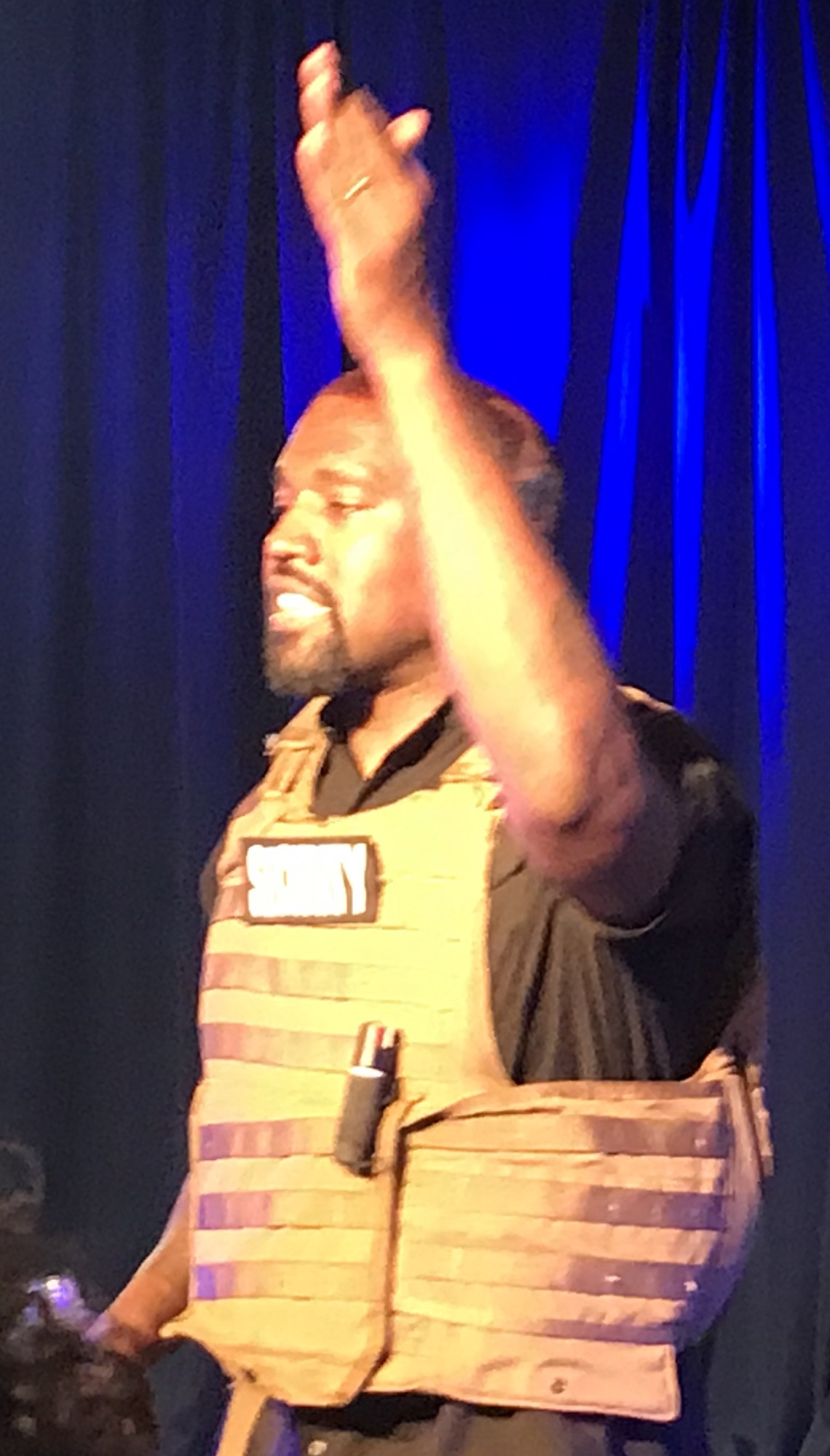
A photo of West at his North Charleston campaign rally in July 2020

American rapper Kanye West announced his 2020 United States presidential election campaign through Twitter on July 4, 2020. On July 16, 2020, the campaign filed a Statement of Candidacy with the Federal Election Commission. He entered the election after missing at least six states' deadlines to appear on the ballot as a third-party candidate. West selected Michelle Tidball, a Christian preacher from Wyoming, as his running mate. West's platform advocated for the creation of a culture of life, endorsing environmental stewardship, supporting the arts, buttressing faith-based organizations, restoring school prayer, and providing for a strong national defense. A supporter of a consistent life ethic (a tenet of Christian democracy), West opposed abortion and capital punishment. The campaign was endorsed by his then-wife, Kim Kardashian (who ultimately switched her endorsement to Joe Biden), as well as a number of fellow rappers and entertainers.

West qualified for ballot access in 13 states. (Note: Colorado, Minnesota, Kentucky, Oklahoma, Arkansas, Louisiana, Utah, Idaho, Iowa, Tennessee, Vermont and Mississippi) The campaign sued for ballot access in five additional states (Arizona, Ohio, Wisconsin, Virginia and West Virginia), and subsequently lost all appeals, gave up on four other states (Illinois, Montana, Missouri, and New Jersey), and missed the deadlines of a further 29 states, plus the District of Columbia. West also appeared on the California ballot, as Rocky De La Fuente's running mate under the American Independent Party, a decision to which neither West nor De La Fuente had consented. Despite this, West urged his followers on Twitter to vote for him as a write-in candidate instead.

West conceded his campaign on November 4, 2020, the morning after Election Day, after receiving roughly 70,000 votes in the 12 states in which he had ballot access. In these states, West ranked 4th (5th in Colorado, Minnesota and Vermont) in terms of statewide vote count, receiving the sixth-highest national vote count for a presidential candidate, as well as the highest vote count for an unaffiliated candidate that year. West expressed interest in running again in 2024 on the same day.

His 2024 presidential election run was announced in November 2022, when West confirmed the launch of his campaign while answering paparazzi questions; he failed to substantiate with a party affiliation, although his voter registration is Republican. Within the following weeks, he appeared on interviews and podcasts with political figures including Alex Jones, Tim Pool, and Proud Boys founder Gavin McInnes, often accompanied by far-right white supremacist Nick Fuentes. Many statements made by West became widely regarded as antisemitic, leading him to be widely condemned and censured by the mass media—to a degree unprecedented in his career. Furthermore, many brands and entities affiliated with West subsequently dissociated with his involvement or likeness. In March 2023, West retracted the statements he made about the Jewish community after claiming to have seen Jonah Hill's performance in the film 21 Jump Street, and the following December, he further apologized in a more formal manner. Throughout 2023, the campaign had been largely stagnant, and in October, a lawyer for West declared on his behalf that he is not actively a candidate.

== 2020 presidential campaign ==
Kanye West 2020 presidential campaign
- Campaign: 2020 United States presidential election
- Candidate: Kanye West; Rapper, designer, businessman, and producer Michelle Tidball; Christian preacher
- Affiliation: Birthday Party / Independent (Note: West appeared on California ballots as the vice presidential nominee of the American Independent Party alongside Rocky De La Fuente, the party's presidential nominee.)
- Announced: July 4, 2020 (Note: Informally announced on August 30, 2015)
- Suspended: November 4, 2020
- Headquarters: Cody, Wyoming
- Key people: John Boyd (senior advisor); Andre Bodiford (custodian of records/treasurer)
- Slogan(s): YES! #2020VISION
- Theme song: "Nah Nah Nah" by Kanye West

Website
- kanye2020.country (archived - November 3, 2020)

=== Past ===
In July 2020, West stated that the idea for his campaign occurred when he was offered the Michael Jackson Video Vanguard Award at the 2015 MTV Video Music Awards (VMA). While showering in his then mother-in-law Kris Jenner's home, West was writing a rap song and thought of the lyric "you're going to run for president". He started laughing hysterically at the thought of including a presidential announcement in his acceptance speech, along with disparaging remarks about award shows. On August 30, 2015, West, after an introduction by Taylor Swift, announced during his VMA acceptance speech that he would be running for president in 2020. The following month, on September 24, West reaffirmed to Vanity Fair that he was considering a 2020 presidential run.

In December 2015, he mentioned his presidential run on his song "Facts". In November 2016, West announced that he supported U.S. president Donald Trump. On December 13, 2016, West met with then President-elect Trump and Ivanka Trump. After meeting with Trump, West implied that he would be running in 2024 instead. When Trump was still running for the Republican nomination, he was asked about running against Kanye and responded, "You know what? I will never say bad about him, you know why? Because he loves Trump!" Though he added, "Now, maybe in a few years I will have to run against him, I don't know. So I'll take that back".

In April 2018, West became popular with conservatives and the alt-right after he publicly supported American conservative pundit Candace Owens. In May 2018, West stated that his presidential run would be a mix between "the Trump campaign and maybe the Bernie Sanders principles".

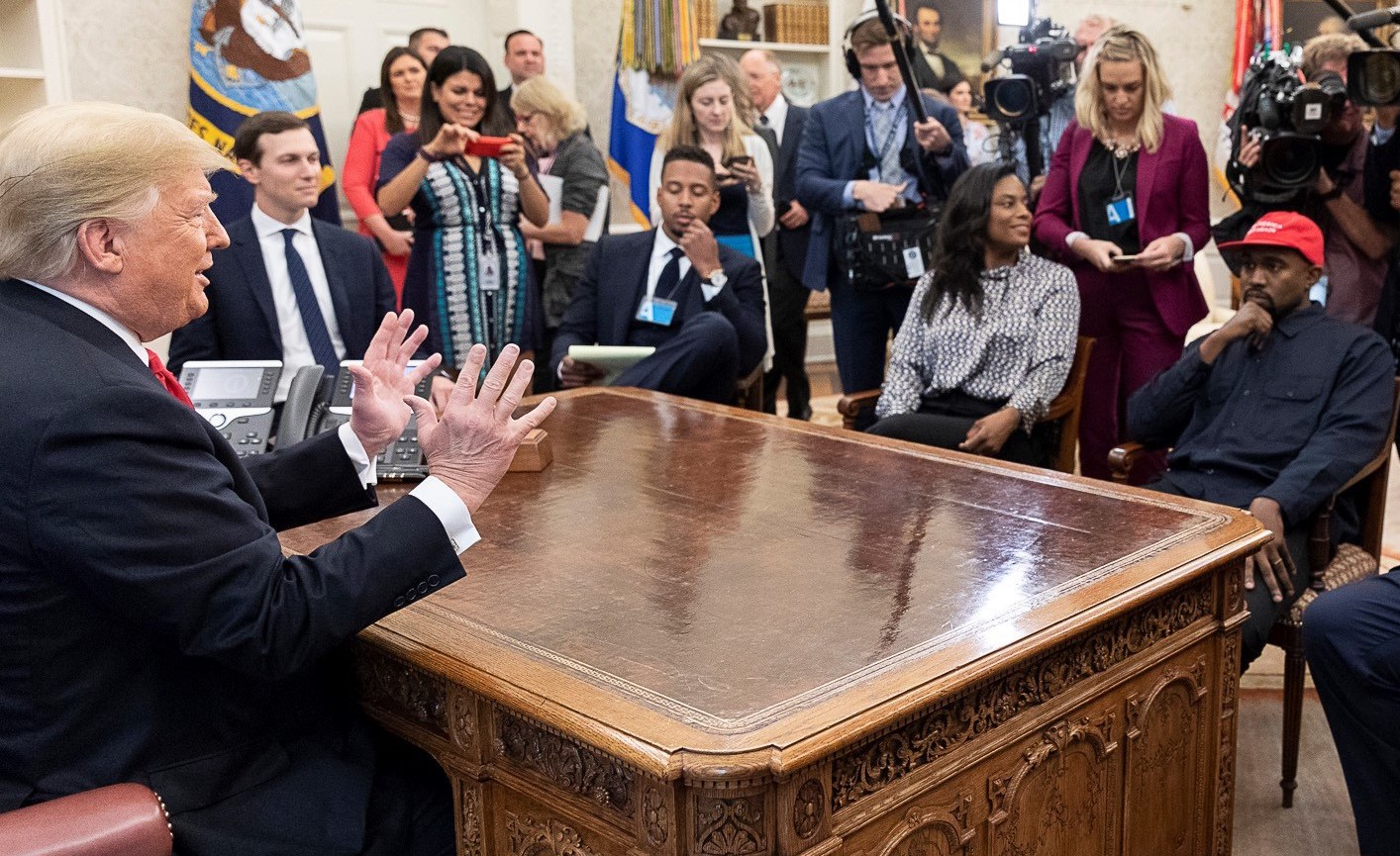
West meeting with President Trump in October 2018

In October 2018, West met with Trump at the Oval Office where he gave praise to the president. That same month, West announced he would be taking a break from politics after a falling out with Owens. The following month, West's then wife Kim Kardashian stated that he supported Trump's personality but had no understanding of his policies.

In an October 2019 interview with New Zealand radio host Zane Lowe, West declared that he would one day be the U.S. president. In November 2019, an audience laughed when West stated that he would run for president in 2024. He stated that manufacturing for his Yeezy brand would move to the United States, adding that "we would've created so many jobs that I'm not going to run [for president in 2024], I'm going to walk." In January 2020, West told GQ that he would be voting during the election cycle and that "we know who I'm voting on."

=== Announcement ===
West announced his campaign on Independence Day via Twitter, writing "We must now realize the promise of America by trusting God, unifying our vision and building our future. I am running for president of the United States! 🇺🇸 #2020VISION". West's campaign announcement went viral, receiving over 100,000 retweets and "Kanye" became the number one trending term in the United States. Various sources questioned whether West was truly running for president or not, as his announcement came after the filing deadlines to run for a major party in all 50 states and most primary elections. (Note: According to Ballotpedia, the deadline for independent candidates to register passed in Indiana, New Mexico, North Carolina, and Texas by July 4, 2020.) However, there is no official deadline to have a candidate registered with the Federal Election Commission (FEC). (Note: At the time of his announcement, the only presidential candidate in the FEC database named Kanye West was a parody Green Party candidate named "Kanye Deez Nutz West", who filed in 2015.) On July 7, West argued that he could gain access to appear on ballots beyond their deadline, using complications caused by the COVID-19 pandemic as precedent.

On July 5, West tweeted a photograph of dome-like personal shelters with the caption "YZY SHLTRS in process". The structures are similar to the prefabricated subsidized housing prototypes West built in August 2019 (inspired by settlements on Tatooine from Star Wars) in Calabasas, California, which had to be torn down as a result of lacking proper permits with the Los Angeles County Department of Public Works. The shelters are designed to be used as housing units for homeless people. On July 7, Entertainment Tonight reported that West was allegedly "telling people close to him that his announcement of running for president is serious". That same day, Trump told RealClearPolitics that he was watching the campaign intently, saying it could serve as a trial run for West if he were to run again in 2024. The FEC began investigating fictitious filings under West's name.

=== Forbes piece and signature collecting ===
West's candidacy was covered by Forbes on July 8. West stated that he would make the final decision to run within 30 days and denied the accusations that his campaign was all merely promotion for his then forthcoming tenth studio album Donda. He revealed his two campaign advisors were his wife Kim Kardashian and SpaceX and Tesla, Inc. CEO, Elon Musk. West also stated that he proposed to Musk that he would "be the head of our space program". West registered to vote for the first time within the previous week and selected Michelle Tidball, a relatively unknown Christian preacher from Wyoming, as his running mate. West stated that he would run under the Birthday Party, because "when we win, it's everybody's birthday", and that he was running for president as a service to God.

Musk reacted to the Forbes piece by tweeting, "We may have more differences of opinion than I anticipated". He later deleted his tweet. On July 9, Trump downplayed West's recent criticism of him, stating that West and Kardashian were "always going to be for us". Trump speculated that West would likely support him because the "radical left" needed to be stopped. The same day, West tweeted a video of himself registering to vote for the first time at the Park County Clerk's Office in Cody, Wyoming. In the video, West discussed with an office employee about changing the difficulties of voter registration in the United States.

Mark Jacoby's company Let The Voters Decide was hired by West to manage the petitions drives around the nation to put West on the ballot for president. Let The Voters Decide is the premiere company in the US for managing petitioners. (Note: Attributed to multiple sources:)

On July 14, Ben Jacobs of Intelligencer reported that a source stated on July 8 that they were paid $5,000 to collect signatures on West's behalf in Florida. They needed to collect 132,781 valid signatures before a July 15 deadline for West to qualify on the ballot as a third-party candidate. The following day, voter turnout specialist Steve Kramer told Jacobs that he had been hired to get West on the ballot in South Carolina and Florida. Kramer stated that at the time, West's team was "working over weekend there, formalizing the FEC and other things that they've got to do when you have a lot of corporate lawyers involved." Kramer followed-up with Jacobs and stated that he had to fire his 180-person staff, made up of paid personnel and volunteers, because West was "out".

=== FEC paperwork and South Carolina rally ===
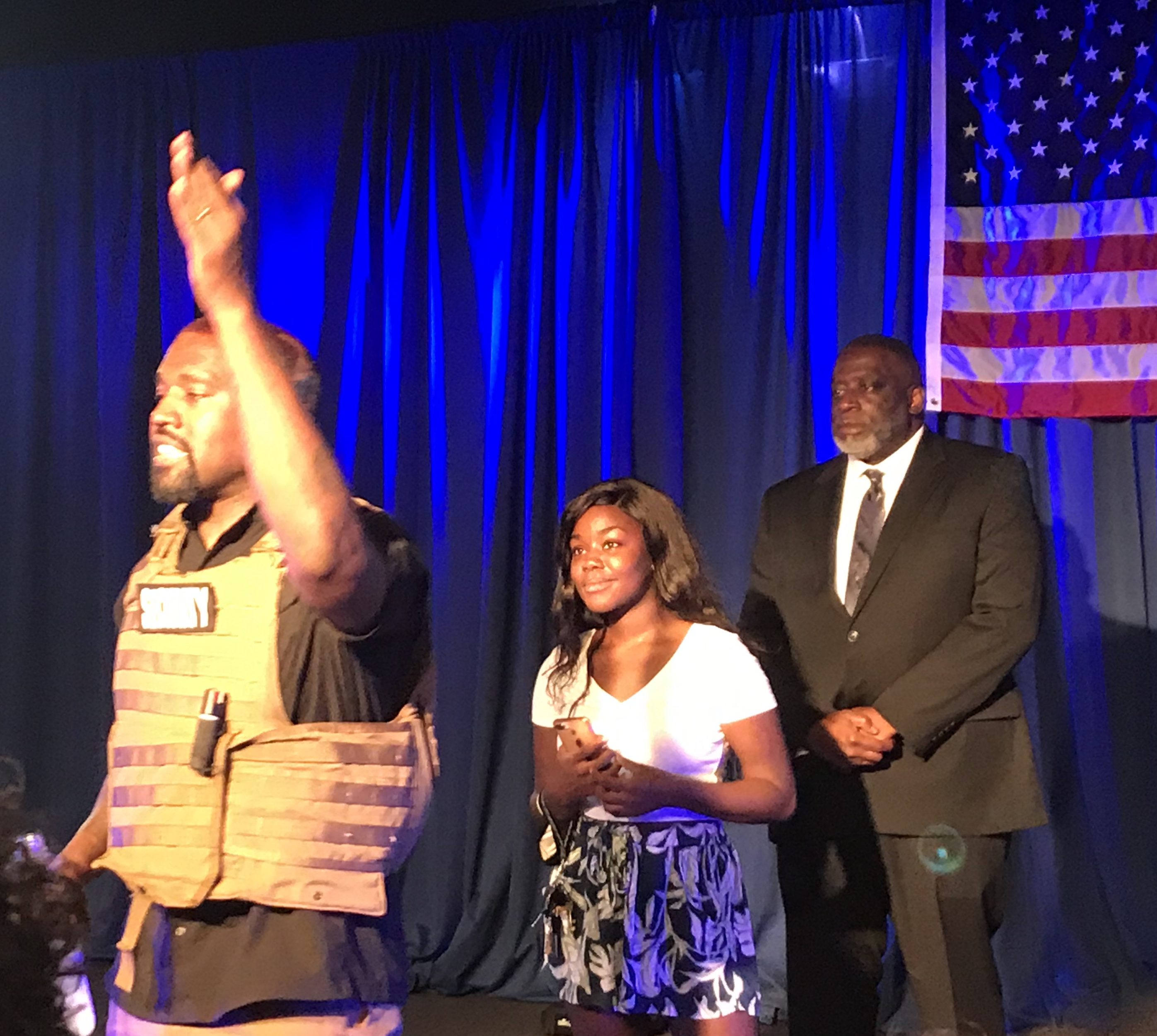
West at his first campaign rally in North Charleston, South Carolina on July 19, 2020

On July 15, a Statement of Organization (Form 1) was filed with the FEC. The filing declared a "Kanye 2020" campaign committee with West running as a presidential candidate under the Birthday Party. The filing listed a property bought by West in October 2019 as its address, along with an inactive website and phone number. West notarized an Oklahoma statement of candidacy while in Miami and had a representative pay a $35,000 filing fee on the day of the state's deadline. The Oklahoma State Election Board later announced that West qualified to appear on the general election ballot as an independent candidate. The following day, West filed a Statement of Candidacy (Form 2) with the FEC, indicating that $5,000 has been raised or spent in campaign-related expenses. Form 2 grants West candidacy status under federal campaign laws.

On July 17, West tweeted out a form for collecting digital signatures from South Carolinians so that he could qualify as an independent candidate in the state; the deadline to collect 10,000 signatures was July 20. The campaign set up nine locations near Charleston, South Carolina, to collect signatures in-person, with West sharing the list of locations through Twitter. The petition locations ran from July 18 to 19. West held his first campaign event at Exquis Event Center in North Charleston, South Carolina, on July 19. West wore a bulletproof vest, spoke without a microphone, and called on audience members to speak. During the speech, West criticized American abolitionist Harriet Tubman and claimed that she did not free the slaves, but instead had the slaves go work for other white people. He emphasized the issue of abortion, and cried describing his father's plan to abort him as an unborn baby, and briefly mentioned that he and his wife had planned to abort his eldest daughter, North. He also discussed his opposition to gun control, his support for the LGBT community, and finding a way to fix drug addiction caused by health care.

In an interview with Kris Kaylin of Charleston radio station WWWZ, West outlined the ten principles of his campaign and stated that he asked fellow rapper Jay-Z if he wanted to replace Tidball as his running mate. The South Carolina Election Commission confirmed on July 20 that West failed to submit his petition on time. On July 22, West tweeted that he may postpone his presidential run to 2024, though he subsequently deleted it.

=== Petition submissions and withdrawals ===
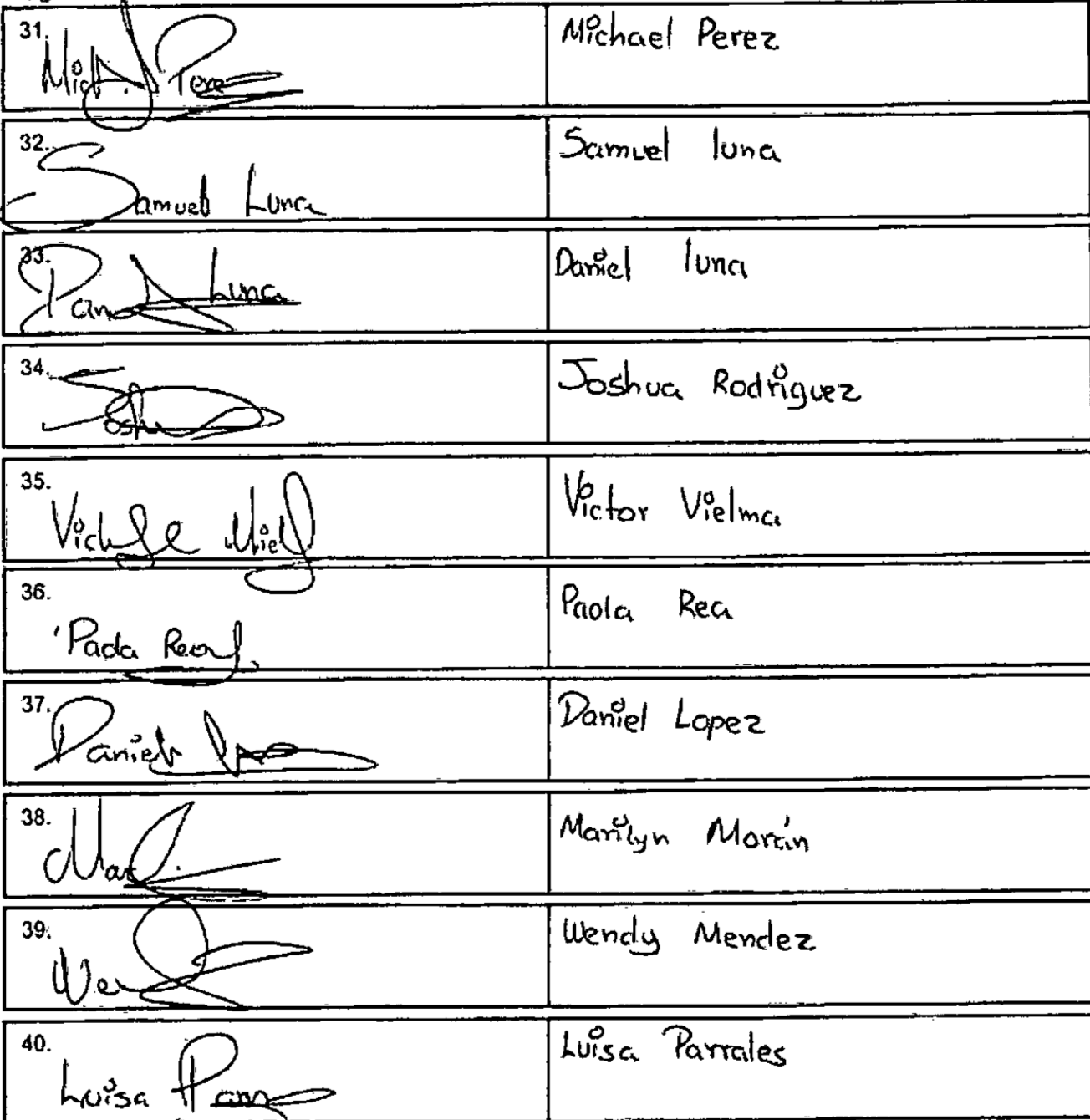
The withdrawn New Jersey petition had several signatures in a row with identical lowercase I's dotted with circles

On July 20, the campaign filed West as an independent candidate in Illinois, where West's childhood home city of Chicago is located, four minutes before the submission deadline. Three objections were filed, all from the Chicago area, and one of which had five individual objectors. August 21 was set as the deadline to verify if the campaign has submitted the minimum 2,500 valid signatures that are required for ballot access. On August 7, 2020, Illinois election officials released a statement saying Kanye West only had 1,200 valid signatures, 1,300 short of qualifying for ballot access.

On July 27, the campaign submitted its petition signatures in Missouri just before the deadline. West also filed as a candidate in New Jersey. Former Democratic congressional candidate in 2018 and attorney, Scott Salmon, challenged West's signature submissions in New Jersey on July 29. Salmon alleged several signatures were written by the same person, stating, "[t]he odds that 30 people in a row from all over the state would have a little circle about the Is is a little hard to believe". The campaign withdrew its New Jersey petition on August 4.

On July 29, TMZ reported that the campaign was canvassing in New York and West Virginia. On August 3, Intelligencer reported the campaign had begun to expand signature-collecting operations into the swing states of Wisconsin and Ohio, along with Arkansas. Multiple challenges were made to West's petition to appear on the Wisconsin ballot. One such challenge suggested numerous problems with West's nomination papers, including incorrect addresses and fake or fraudulent signatures, such as "Mickey Mouse" and "Bernie Sanders." It also included affidavits from six individuals who said they were duped into putting their names on West's paperwork. A lawyer for the campaign responded to the missed deadline allegation by blaming iPhone clocks for being "notoriously faulty". West accused the Democratic Party of hiring a private investigator to follow his signature collectors as part of an "organized effort of harassment and intimidation".

On August 7, 2020, it became mathematically impossible for the campaign to get the required number of electoral votes for West to win the presidency.

On August 20, 2020, election officials in Wisconsin and Montana decided that West was not eligible to appear on their state ballots. A day later, officials in Ohio, Illinois and West Virginia ruled that he did not qualify either for their respective ballots. On the contrary, West has qualified to appear on the ballot in at least Arkansas, Colorado, Oklahoma, Utah and Vermont, according to spokespersons for the election offices in those states. A spokesman for the Iowa secretary of state's office said West's nominating petitions have been accepted in that state but are still subject to objections.

=== Republican Party contacts ===
Numerous Republican Party members have been involved in the campaign's organization and petition. Gregg Keller, the former executive director of the American Conservative Union and worker for Mitt Romney and Josh Hawley, was listed as West's point of contact when he filed in Arkansas. Lane Ruhland, who had served as legal counsel for the Republican Party of Wisconsin, was filmed dropping off the signatures to qualify West for the state ballot to the state elections commission. In Virginia, West's campaign gives the address of the law firm Holtzman Vogel Josefiak Torchinsky, whose managing partner is state senator Jill Holtzman Vogel. In Wisconsin, West's legal advocate had been secretary-treasurer of the Minnesota Republican party.

In Vermont, West submitted three presidential electors which included Chuck Wilton, a Vermont delegate to the 2020 Republican National Convention. Wilton was later replaced by Bradford Broyles, the former chairman of the Rutland County Republican Party, as a presidential elector for West. In Colorado, four of the nine presidential electors for West were Republican operatives. In Tennessee, West submitted twelve presidential electors which included Rick Williams, a Tennessee delegate to the 2016 Republican National Convention who had supported Trump and served as director of Middle Tennessee for Trump.

West met with Trump's senior advisor Jared Kushner in Colorado to have a discussion on "black empowerment," while ostensibly running against Donald Trump.

According to Reuters, on January 4, 2021, a Kanye West-linked publicist pressured a Georgia election worker to confess to false charges of election tampering to assist Trump's claims of election interference.

In December 2021, The Daily Beast reported that West's 2020 presidential campaign received millions of dollars in services from a secret network of Republican operatives, some of these payments the committee did not report, and used an unusual abbreviation for the others to allegedly conceal the association with the GOP according to campaign finance experts.

=== Marketing ===
On August 18, West tweeted a promotional poster for his campaign. It features pictures of diverse people, in between the phrase "Kanye 2020 Vision". An image of Kirsten Dunst is featured prominently, prompting the actress to reply, "What's the message here, and why am I apart [sic] of it?"

West debuted his first official campaign video on October 12, in which he emphasized religious freedom and family values as core issues to his candidacy.

=== Campaign finance ===
West raised $14,538,989.74 on his presidential campaign, loaning $12,473,002.99 of his own money to his campaign and raising $2,064,715.66 from individual contributions. He spent $13,210,013.02 and has $250,000.00 in outstanding debts with $1,328,976.72 of ending cash in hand.

In April 2021, a document obtained by Citizens for Responsibility and Ethics in Washington showed that the Office of Government Ethics was refusing to certify West's financial returns. According to CREW's communications director Jordan Libowitz, this was likely because West declined to fully disclose his wife Kim Kardashian's income and assets by using a rare exemption when the candidate has no knowledge of such income and assets. Libowitz also pointed out West's failure to disclose information about three trusts he was a trustee for, and that any penalties were unlikely to be substantial.

In December 2021, The Daily Beast reported that Kanye's presidential campaign received millions of dollars in services from a secret network of Republican Party operatives, including Republican elite advisors and a managing partner at one of the largest conservative political firms in the United States. The Kanye campaign committee also did not report having paid some of these advisors and used an abbreviation for another advisor, constituting a potential violation of federal laws. According to campaign finance experts, these actions were done in an attempt to hide any connections between Kanye's presidential campaign and Republican operatives.

Candidate	Campaign committee					
Candidate	Raised	Total loans	Ind. contrib.	Item. Ind. contrib.	Unitem. Ind. contrib.	Spent
Kanye West	$14,538,989.74	$12,473,002.99	$2,064,715.66	$846,410.00	$1,218,306.00	$13,210,013.02

State/territory	Campaign fundraising and spending by state/territory			
State/territory	Ind. contrib.	Ind. contrib. <$200	% <$200	Spent
Arizona	$500.00	$0.00	0.00%	$1,473,284.00
California	$1,500.00	$0.00	0.00%	$94,677.73
Georgia	$0.00	$0.00	0.00%	$273.80
Minnesota	$250.00	$250.00	100.00%	$25,000.00
Missouri	$0.00	$0.00	0.00%	$1,291,673.44
New Jersey	$0.00	$0.00	0.00%	$28,500.00
New Mexico	$0.00	$0.00	0.00%	$21,834.03
New York	$1,000.00	$0.00	0.00%	$2,860,375.69
Oklahoma	$0.00	$0.00	0.00%	$40,000.00
South Carolina	$0.00	$0.00	0.00%	$84,452.47

=== Analysis ===
On July 4, Jack Dolan of the Los Angeles Times speculated that West's presidential campaign "might be part of an effort to draw Black supporters away from Joe Biden to help Trump." However, Andrew Solender of Forbes wrote that available polling data suggested that, if anything, West's run would likely hurt Trump rather than Biden.

On July 7, West stated that he was okay with splitting off black voters from the Democratic Party. Trump stated on July 11 that it "shouldn't be hard" for West to siphon black voters from Biden. In his South Carolina rally, West stated that "the most racist thing that's ever been said out loud" was the idea that he would split black voters. On August 6, when asked if he intended to damage Biden's campaign, he stated, "I'm not denying it."

Several publications, including Politico, The Guardian, and Forbes, questioned whether West's campaign was a legitimate effort or a publicity stunt. West disputed allegations that his campaign was promotion for his music in July 2020.

Multiple Republican operatives assisted West in his attempts to make the presidential ballots of multiple states, including convention delegates for incumbent U.S. president Donald Trump. Lane Ruhland, a Republican lawyer and former general counsel for the Wisconsin Republican Party, personally delivered West's nominating papers to state regulators past the state's statutory filing deadline. The connections raised questions about the aims of the entertainer's campaign, and whether it was genuine in its sincerity or intended to act as a spoiler and aid Trump's reelection bid. Trump denied any personal involvement with aiding the campaign, stating, "I like Kanye very much, but no, I have nothing to do with him getting on the ballot. We'll have to see what happens." John Avlon of CNN compared the campaign's association with several Republicans to that of alleged Republican efforts to bolster the 2004 presidential campaign of Ralph Nader.

On October 20, former child actor and independent presidential candidate Brock Pierce invited West to a third-party presidential debate in Wyoming. West did not respond publicly to the invite.

=== Endorsements ===
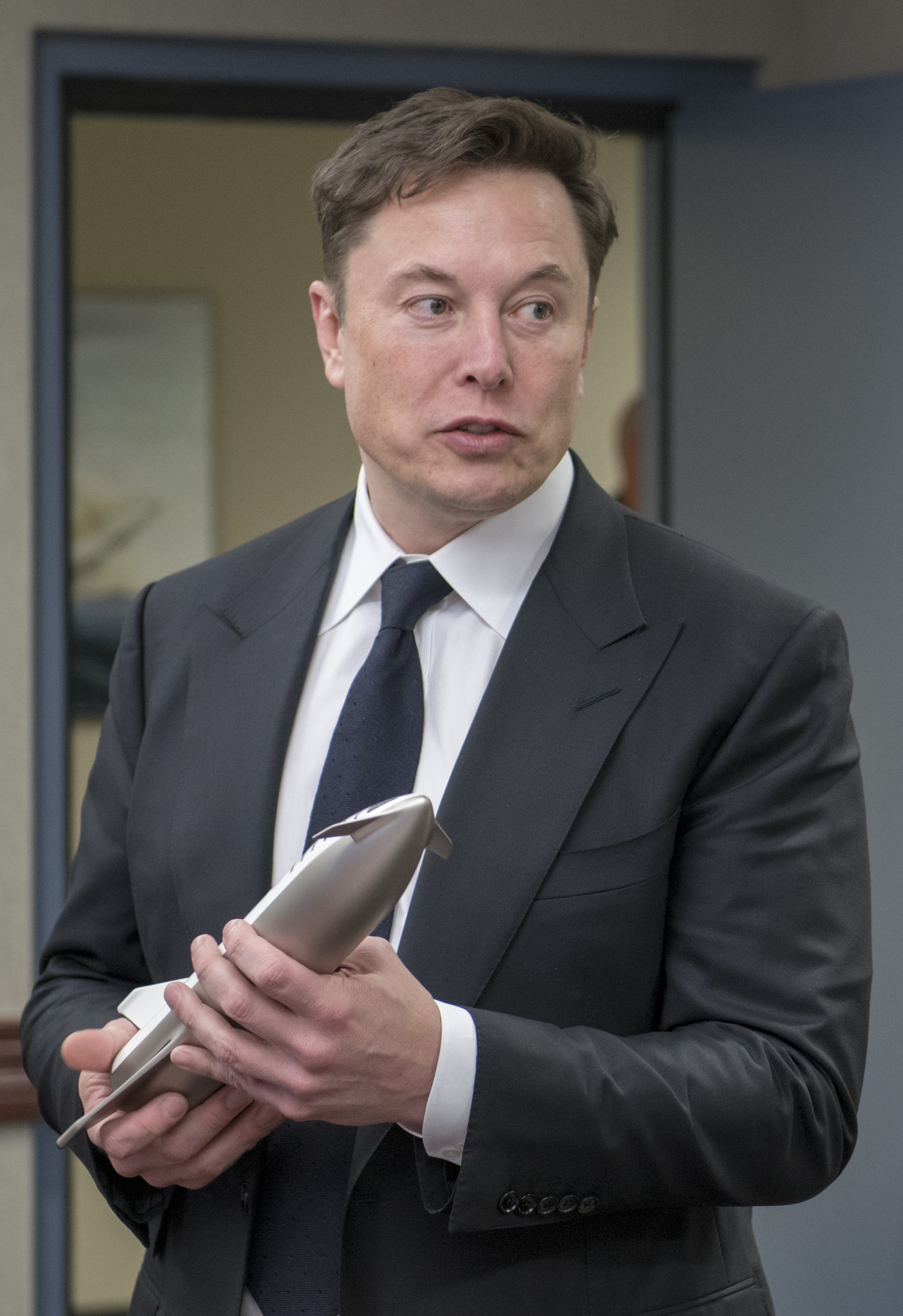
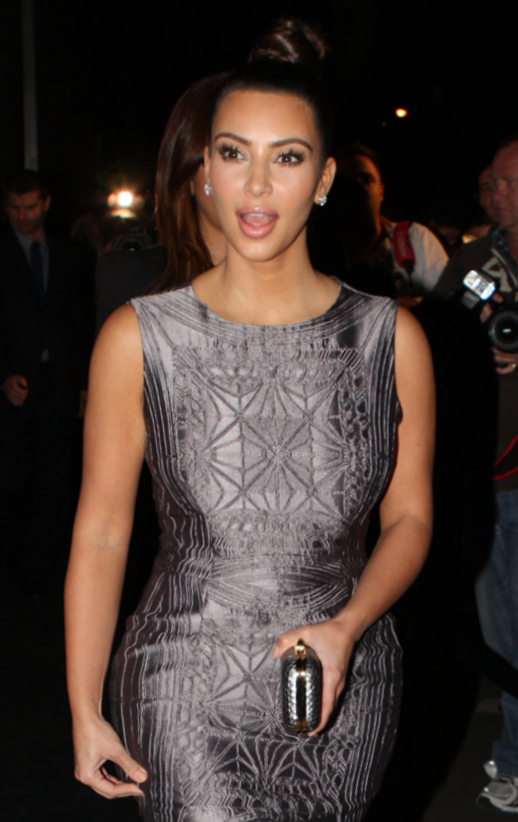
Elon Musk (left) and Kim Kardashian (right) endorsed West on the day of his campaign announcement

The following individuals endorsed West:

- Dez Bryant, professional football player
- Nick Cannon, comedian, rapper, and television host
- DaBaby, rapper and songwriter
- Khloé Kardashian, media personality and West's then-sister-in-law
- Kim Kardashian, media personality and West's then-wife
- Kourtney Kardashian, media personality and West's then-sister-in-law
- Rose McGowan, actress, activist, author, director, and singer
- Elon Musk, CEO of SpaceX and Tesla, Inc. (also endorsed Andrew Yang, voted for Joe Biden)
- Darrelle Revis, retired professional football player
- Dennis Rodman, American basketball player
- Ty Dolla Sign, singer, songwriter, and record producer
- Rochelle Stevens, 1996 Olympic gold medalist for the United States in the women's 4x400-meter relay

=== Ballot access ===
Qualified for ballot access (84 EV) Ballot access petition failed (104 EV) Ballot access deadline missed (350 EV)

- Qualified for presidential ballot access (12 states, 84 electoral votes): Arkansas, Colorado, Idaho, Iowa, Kentucky, Louisiana, Minnesota, Mississippi, Oklahoma, Tennessee, Utah, and Vermont.
- Presidential ballot access requirements submitted but withdrawn, dismissed, or denied (nine states, 104 electoral votes): Arizona, Illinois, Missouri, Montana, New Jersey, Wisconsin, Ohio, Virginia, and West Virginia.
- Presidential ballot access deadline missed (29 states + the District of Columbia, 350 electoral votes): Alabama, Alaska, California, Connecticut, Delaware, the District of Columbia, Florida, Georgia, Hawaii, Indiana, Kansas, Maine, Maryland, Massachusetts, Michigan, Nebraska, Nevada, New Hampshire, New Mexico, New York, North Carolina, North Dakota, Oregon, Pennsylvania, Rhode Island, South Carolina, South Dakota, Texas, Washington, and Wyoming.

=== Litigation ===
On August 5, 2020, West submitted his presidential petition in Ohio with 14,886 signatures, more than the 5,000 required. However, the Secretary of State of Ohio rejected his petition stating that the original declaration of candidacy did not match the copies used on each petition sheet. On August 26, West filed a lawsuit against the Secretary of State to the Supreme Court of Ohio to get onto the ballot, but the Ohio Supreme Court ruled 7–0 on September 10, that West would not appear on the ballot.

When West submitted his presidential petitions in Wisconsin multiple witnesses alleged that he was eighteen seconds past the 5:00 p.m. deadline. A challenge to West's petitions was filed. On August 19, the staff of the Wisconsin Elections Commission recommended that West be removed from the ballot, and on August 20, the commission voted to remove West from the ballot. West filed a lawsuit after being removed from the ballot. On September 10, the Wisconsin Supreme Court ordered election officials to stop mailing out ballots until the court ruled on whether or not Howie Hawkins and/or West could appear on the ballot. On September 11, Brown County Circuit Judge John Zakowski ruled that the election commission was correct to remove West from the ballot.

On September 14, 2020, a U.S. District Judge in West Virginia struck down West's challenge to appear on the West Virginia ballot.

Lawsuits were filed to keep West off the ballot in Virginia, Arizona, and Idaho. On September 3, 2020, a Richmond, Virginia, judge ordered that Kanye West's name not appear on the Virginia ballot, and a Maricopa County, Arizona, judge ordered that Kanye West's name not appear on the Arizona ballot. West appealed the decision, but the decision became final after it was confirmed by Arizona Supreme Court on September 8. West also appealed the Virginia decision to the Virginia Supreme Court. On September 17, 2020, the Virginia Supreme Court rejected West's appeal to appear on the ballot.

An attempt was made to remove West from the Idaho presidential ballot on the grounds that West could not run as an independent candidate while registered as a Republican. However, Lawerence Denney, the Secretary of State of Idaho, stated that West would remain on the ballot. The Idaho Democratic Party filed a lawsuit to remove West from the ballot on the basis that he cannot run as an independent because he is registered as a Republican.

=== Polling ===
West was only included as an option on a small proportion of polls (see nationwide and state-level polling).

==== National polls ====
Poll source	Date(s) administered	Sample size (Note: Key: A – all adults RV – registered voters LV – likely voters V – unclear)	Margin of error	Kanye West (B)	Donald Trump (R)	Joe Biden (D)	Other	Undecided
Léger	October 29 – November 1, 2020	827 (LV)	± 3.1%	1%	42%	50%	3% (Note: 2% for Jo Jorgensen; 1% for Howie Hawkins.)	4%
Léger	October 23–25, 2020	834 (LV)	± 3.1%	1%	41%	49%	5% (Note: 4% for Jo Jorgensen; 1% for Howie Hawkins.)	5%
Ipsos	October 20–22, 2020	1,214 (RV)	–	1%	39%	49%	6%	10%
Echelon Insights	October 16–20, 2020	1006 (LV)	–	0%	44%	50%	2% (Note: 1% for Jo Jorgensen; 1% for Howie Hawkins.)	3%
Léger	October 16–18, 2020	821 (LV)	± 3.1%	1%	41%	50%	4% (Note: 2% for Jo Jorgensen; 2% for Howie Hawkins.)	5%
Ipsos	October 13–15, 2020	1,133 (RV)	–	2%	38%	48%	8%	9%
Léger	October 9–11, 2020	841 (LV)	± 3.1%	1%	39%	50%	4% (Note: 3% for Jo Jorgensen; 1% for Howie Hawkins.)	7% (Note: 6% undecided; 1% would not vote.)
Ipsos	October 2–6, 2020	882 (LV)	± 3.1%	0%	40%	52%	5%	3%
Léger	October 2–4, 2020	843 (LV)	± 3.1%	1%	40%	49%	3%	7%
Léger	September 25–27, 2020	854 (LV)	± 3.1%	1%	40%	47%	4%	9% (Note: 8% undecided; 1% would not vote.)
Echelon Insights	September 19–25, 2020	1,018 (LV)	–	1%	41%	50%	3%	6%
Léger	September 11–13, 2020	833 (LV)	± 3.1%	1%	41%	47%	2% (Note: 2% for Jo Jorgensen.)	8% (Note: 7% undecided; 1% would not vote.)
Léger	September 4–6, 2020	861 (LV)	± 3.1%	1%	41%	47%	3%	7%
Léger	August 28–30, 2020	861 (LV)	± 3.1%	1%	42%	49%	1% (Note: 1% for Jo Jorgensen.)	7%
Léger	August 21–23, 2020	894 (LV)	± 3.1%	1%	40%	49%	3%	7%
Echelon Insights	August 14–18, 2020	1,000 (LV)	–	1%	38%	51%	3%	8%
Ipsos	August 10–11, 2020	1,034 (RV)	–	2%	38%	47%	6%	8% (Note: 6% undecided; 2% would not vote.)
Morning Consult	August 9–10, 2020	1,983 (RV)	± 2%	2%	40%	49%	–	9%
Léger	August 4–7, 2020	1,019 (LV)	± 2.8%	2%	39%	47%	3%	8%
Redfield & Wilton Strategies	July 9, 2020	1,853 (RV)	± 2.9%	2%	39%	48%	4% (Note: 2% for Jo Jorgensen; 1% for Howie Hawkins; 1% for other.)	6%
Study Finds/SurveyMonkey	July 8, 2020	469 (A)	–	8%	37%	55%	–	–

==== Hypothetical polls ====
Poll source	Date(s) administered	Sample size	Margin of error	Kanye West (B)	Mike Pence (R)	Joe Biden (D)	Other	Undecided
Léger	August 4–7, 2020	1,019 (LV)	± 2.8%	5%	29%	46%	6% (Note: 4% for Jo Jorgensen; 2% for Howie Hawkins.)	14%

==== Statewide polls ====
===== Arizona =====
Poll source	Date(s) administered	Sample size	Margin of error	Kanye West (B)	Donald Trump (R)	Joe Biden (D)	Other	Undecided
Ipsos	October 27 – November 2, 2020	610 (LV)	± 4.5%	1%	47%	50%	2% (Note: 1% for Jo Jorgensen; 1% for other.)	0%
Ipsos	October 21–27, 2020	714 (LV)	± 4.2%	1%	47%	47%	4% (Note: 2% for Jo Jorgensen; 2% for other.)	0%
Ipsos	October 14–21, 2020	658 (LV)	± 4.4%	0%	46%	50%	3% (Note: 1% for Jo Jorgensen; 2% for other.)	0%
Ipsos	October 7–14, 2020	667 (LV)	± 4.3%	0%	47%	49%	2%	1%
Redfield & Wilton Strategies	August 30 – September 4, 2020	830 (RV)	–	0%	43%	48%	1% (Note: 1% for Howie Hawkins)	6%
Redfield & Wilton Strategies	August 16–19, 2020	856 (RV)	–	2%	38%	47%	3% (Note: 1% for Jo Jorgensen; 1% for Howie Hawkins; 1% for other.)	10%
Redfield & Wilton Strategies	July 19–23, 2020	858 (RV)	–	2%	38%	46%	4%	11%

===== Florida =====
Poll source	Date(s) administered	Sample size	Margin of error	Kanye West (B)	Donald Trump (R)	Joe Biden (D)	Other	Undecided
Ipsos	October 27 – November 1, 2020	670 (LV)	± 4.3%	1%	46%	50%	1%	0%
Ipsos	October 21–27, 2020	704 (LV)	± 4.2%	1%	47%	48%	3%	0%
Ipsos	October 14–20, 2020	662 (LV)	± 4.3%	1%	47%	48%	1%	0%
Ipsos	October 7–14, 2020	653 (LV)	± 4.4%	0%	47%	50%	2%	0%

===== Iowa =====
Poll source	Date(s) administered	Sample size	Margin of error	Kanye West (B)	Donald Trump (R)	Joe Biden (D)	Other	Undecided
Opinion Insight	October 5–8, 2020	800 (LV)	± 3.45%	1%	45%	47%	2%	4%

===== Michigan =====
Poll source	Date(s) administered	Sample size	Margin of error	Kanye West (B)	Donald Trump (R)	Joe Biden (D)	Other	Undecided
Ipsos	October 27 – November 1, 2020	654 (LV)	± 4.4%	0%	43%	53%	3%	0%
Ipsos	October 20–26, 2020	652 (LV)	± 4.4%	1%	43%	53%	3%	0%
Ipsos	October 14–20, 2020	686 (LV)	± 4.3%	0%	44%	52%	4%	0%
Ipsos	October 7–13, 2020	620 (LV)	± 4.5%	1%	44%	51%	4%	0%

===== Minnesota =====
Poll source	Date(s) administered	Sample size	Margin of error	Kanye West (B)	Donald Trump (R)	Joe Biden (D)	Other	Undecided
Trafalgar Group	October 24–25, 2020	1,065 (LV)	± 2.92%	3%	45%	48%	3% (Note: 2% for Jo Jorgensen; 1% for other.)	1%
Change Research	October 12–15, 2020	1,021 (LV)	± 3.1%	1%	44%	49%	4%	2%
Suffolk University	September 20–24, 2020	500 (LV)	–	1%	40%	47%	4% (Note: 2% for Jo Jorgensen; 1% for Rocky De La Fuente;1% for other.)	8% (Note: 6% undecided; 2% refused.)

===== North Carolina =====
Poll source	Date(s) administered	Sample size	Margin of error	Kanye West (B)	Donald Trump (R)	Joe Biden (D)	Other	Undecided
Ipsos	October 27 – November 1, 2020	707 (LV)	± 4.2%	1%	48%	49%	3%	0%
Ipsos	October 21–27, 2020	647 (LV)	± 4.4%	0%	48%	49%	3%	0%
Ipsos	October 14–20, 2020	660 (LV)	± 4.3%	0%	47%	49%	3%	0%
Ipsos	October 7–13, 2020	660 (LV)	± 4.3%	0%	48%	48%	3%	0%

===== Oklahoma =====
Poll source	Date(s) administered	Sample size	Margin of error	Kanye West (B)	Donald Trump (R)	Joe Biden (D)	Other	Undecided
SoonerPoll	October 15–20, 2020	5466 (LV)	–	1%	59%	37%	1% (Note: 1% for Jo Jorgensen; 0% for Jade Simmons; 0% for Brock Pierce.)	2%
Amber Integrated	September 17–20, 2020	500 (LV)	± 4.38%	1%	55%	33%	3% (Note: 1% for Jo Jorgensen; 1% for Jade Simmons; 1% for Brock Pierce.)	7% (Note: 6% undecided; 1% refused.)
SoonerPoll	September 2–8, 2020	486 (LV)	–	1%	60%	35%	0%	4%

===== Pennsylvania =====
Poll source	Date(s) administered	Sample size	Margin of error	Kanye West (B)	Donald Trump (R)	Joe Biden (D)	Other	Undecided
Ipsos	October 27 – November 1, 2020	622 (LV)	± 4.3%	0%	45%	51%	4%	0%
Ipsos	October 20–26, 2020	655 (LV)	± 4.4%	0%	44%	51%	4% (Note: 3% for Jo Jorgensen; 1% for other)	0%
Ipsos	October 13–19, 2020	653 (LV)	± 4.4%	1%	45%	49%	4%	0%
Ipsos	October 6–11, 2020	622 (LV)	± 4.5%	0%	45%	51%	2%	1%
Redfield & Wilton Strategies	July 19–21, 2020	1,016 (RV)	–	1%	41%	48%	2%	8%

===== Wisconsin =====
Poll source	Date(s) administered	Sample size	Margin of error	Kanye West (B)	Donald Trump (R)	Joe Biden (D)	Other	Undecided
Ipsos	October 27 – November 1, 2020	696 (LV)	± 4.2%	0%	43%	53%	4%	0%
Ipsos	October 20–26, 2020	664 (LV)	± 4.3%	0%	44%	53%	4%	0%
Ipsos	October 13–19, 2020	663 (LV)	± 4.3%	1%	45%	51%	4%	0%
Ipsos	October 6–11, 2020	577 (LV)	± 4.7%	0%	45%	52%	3%	1%
Redfield & Wilton Strategies	August 16–17, 2020	672 (RV)	–	1%	39%	49%	3%	7%
Redfield & Wilton Strategies	July 19–24, 2020	742 (RV)	–	2%	35%	45%	3%	15%

=== Favorability ===
Poll source	Date(s) administered	Sample size	Margin of error	Favorable	Unfavorable	Unsure
Morning Consult	August 9–10, 2020	1,983 (RV)	± 2%	17%	66%	17% (Note: 3% for "Never heard of"; 14% for "No opinion".)
	July 4, 2020	West announces his candidacy				
SSRS/CNN	May 2–5, 2018	1,015 (A)	± 3.6%	23%	53%	24% (Note: 9% for "Never heard of"; 15% for "No opinion".)
YouGov/Huffington Post	April 27–29, 2018	1,000 (A)	± 3.9%	18%	56%	26%
	November 8, 2016	Trump wins the 2016 presidential election				
YouGov/Huffington Post	September 1–2, 2015	1,000 (A)	–	13%	69%	18%

=== Results ===
Kanye West's performance by state in the 12 states he had ballot access. Legend: 0.2-0.3% 0.3-0.4% 0.4-0.5%

Kanye West's performance (rounded to a single decimal place) by county in the 12 states he had ballot access. Legend: 0.0% 0.1% 0.2% 0.3% 0.4% 0.5% 0.6% 0.7% 0.8% 0.9% 1.0%+

West received 66,641 votes in the 12 states he had ballot access in, receiving an average of 0.32%; West received the most votes in the state of Tennessee, where he won 10,256 votes. However, percentage-wise, West's best state was in Utah, where he received 0.48%. Additionally, he received 5,072 write-in votes from various states. (Note: Attributed to multiple sources:)

Write-in votes

Kanye West / Michelle Tidball 2020 Results by state
State	Votes	%	Position	Winner
Arkansas	4,096	0.34	4th out of 13	Donald Trump (R)
Colorado	8,080	0.25	5th out of 21	Joe Biden (D)
Connecticut	255	0.01	5th overall	Joe Biden (D)
Delaware	169	0.03	5th overall	Joe Biden (D)
Idaho	3,632	0.42	4th out of 7	Donald Trump (R)
Iowa	3,400	0.20	4th out of 9	Donald Trump (R)
Kansas	332	0.02	6th overall	Donald Trump (R)
Kentucky	6,479	0.30	4th out of 5	Donald Trump (R)
Louisiana	4,897	0.23	4th out of 13	Donald Trump (R)
Maryland	1,117	0.04	6th overall	Joe Biden (D)
Minnesota	7,937	0.24	5th out of 9	Joe Biden (D)
Mississippi	3,656	0.28	4th out of 9	Donald Trump (R)
New Hampshire	82	0.01	8th overall	Joe Biden (D)
New York	1,897	0.02	5th overall	Joe Biden (D)
Oklahoma	5,597	0.36	4th out of 6	Donald Trump (R)
Rhode Island	131	0.03	9th overall	Joe Biden (D)
Tennessee	10,256	0.34	4th out of 9	Donald Trump (R)
Utah	7,213	0.48	4th out of 9	Donald Trump (R)
Vermont	1,269	0.35	5th out of 21	Joe Biden (D)
Wisconsin	1,089	0.01	7th overall	Joe Biden (D)
Source: Decision Desk HQ

In addition, the Roque De La Fuente / Kanye West ticket won 60,160 votes in California (0.34%; 5th out of 6). The winner was Joe Biden (D).

West's voters base varied among education levels, age, race, gender, and partisanship. However his voters were more likely to be religious on average. Had West won he would've been the first elected President to have been a professional musician.

== 2024 presidential campaign ==
Kanye West 2024 presidential campaign
- Campaign: 2024 United States presidential election
- Candidate: Kanye West
- Affiliation: Republican Party (registered); Independent (de facto)
- Announced: November 20, 2022
- Suspended: October 20, 2023
- Headquarters: Los Angeles, California, U.S.
- Key people: Ali Alexander; Nick Fuentes; Milo Yiannopoulos; Sneako (Nicolas Kenn De Balinthazy)

On the morning of November 4, 2020, West conceded in a tweet that read "WELP KANYE 2024 🕊". In August 2021, West issued Donda merchandise including a "$200 layered t-shirt that features both the presidential seal and the numbers '2024'". On November 20, 2022, West confirmed his candidacy for the presidency in 2024 while answering paparazzi questions, also revealing that far-right commentator Milo Yiannopoulos and live streamer Sneako were working for his campaign.

=== Trump–West–Fuentes meeting ===
Within a few days after his announcement, West visited Donald Trump at Mar-a-Lago, along with political advisor Karen Giorno and far-right commentator Nick Fuentes, a white nationalist and Holocaust denier. On November 24, West released a video in which he stated that Trump began screaming at him and telling him that he was going to lose after West asked Trump to be his vice-presidential candidate, stating:

When Trump started basically screaming at me at the table telling me I was going to lose — I mean has that ever worked for anyone in history. I'm like hold on, hold on, hold on, Trump, you're talking to Ye.

In response, Trump released a statement that after contacting him earlier in the week to arrange the visit, West "unexpectedly showed up with three of his friends, whom I knew nothing about", with whom Trump dined, and that "the dinner was quick and uneventful". Trump further elaborated several days later that he met with Kanye to "help a seriously troubled man, who just happens to be black... who has been decimated in his business and virtually everything else". Trump also stated that he told West, "don't run for office, a total waste of time, can't win".

=== Later developments ===
On November 28, 2022, YouTuber and political commentator Tim Pool interviewed West, Fuentes, and Yiannopoulos regarding West's campaign. Pool showed West an article posted about Mike Pence saying that Trump was wrong for allowing anti-Semitic people to eat with him at dinner, and demanding that he apologize. On December 4, Yiannopoulos announced that he had parted ways with the campaign.

In a December interview with far-right conspiracy theorist Alex Jones, West garnered significant controversy after declaring that he "loves" Adolf Hitler and denying the Holocaust, adding that "I love Jewish people, but I also love Nazis". Shortly after the interview, West went on to tweet a photo of a swastika intertwined with a Star of David resulting in his second suspension from Twitter. As of July 2023, his account has been reinstated. On December 5, 2022, far-right commentator and Proud Boys founder Gavin McInnes interviewed West alongside Nick Fuentes, with West saying that Hitler's reputation was crafted "by Jews". West further stated in the interview that society needed to be restructured around a Christian government, and that the media in the United States needed to be controlled by Christians, saying, "If you don't believe in Jesus Christ you are wrong."

=== Aftermath ===
Lori Kauffman, who worked on West's 2020 presidential campaign, ran for public office in Boston, Massachusetts as a Republican. She was formally condemned by the state's party for various offensive comments, such as calling for the exile of the Jews (despite being raised Jewish herself) and expressing admiration of Hitler.

In West's 2025 song "WW3", West raps he "voted for Trump, not Biden", without referencing his own run.

== Political positions ==
West's platform advocated for the creation of a culture of life, endorsing environmental stewardship, supporting the arts, buttressing faith-based organizations, restoring school prayer, providing for a strong national defense, and "America First" diplomacy. His 10-point policy agenda was listed under the headline "Creating a Culture of Life," and featured a Bible verse for each item. Being in support of a consistent life ethic, a tenet of Christian democracy political ideology, West opposes abortion and capital punishment. West stated in July 2020 that he would run for president under the banner of the newly formed Birthday Party, but had Trump not been running, he would have affiliated himself with the Republican Party.

=== Abortion and birth control ===
In October 2019, West spoke out against abortion, stating "thou shalt not kill". He also alleged that the Democratic Party was pushing black people to use levonorgestrel, commonly known as Plan B, as a form of voter suppression. West's comments were praised by anti-abortion organizations Live Action and Students for Life, and the conservative news website The Daily Wire. In July 2020, West stated "I am pro-life because I'm following the word of the Bible" and expressed his belief that "Planned Parenthoods have been placed inside cities by white supremacists to do the Devil's work." Nia Martin-Robinson of Planned Parenthood criticized West's statements, asserting that "[a]ny insinuation that abortion is Black genocide is offensive and infantilizing".

At a July rally in South Carolina, West stated abortion should be legal because "the law is not by God anyway". However, he proposed giving every mother that does not abort their child a financial incentive, using "$1 million or something in that range" as an example. He did not disclose how he would pay for such incentives.

=== Black Lives Matter and police brutality ===
In November 2016, West told black people to "stop focusing on racism", but clarified that his support for Trump did not mean he did not "believe in Black Lives Matter." In June 2020, West participated in the George Floyd protests and donated $2 million to help victims of the rioting that took place during demonstrations. He also paid off Floyd's daughter's college tuition. The following month, West stated that one of his priorities would be to end police brutality, adding that "[the] police are people too".

=== Education ===
West has called for a complete tearing down and reformation of the American education system many times. During his 2018 visit to the White House, West criticized the American education system by stating "sometimes people say this kid has ADD, this kid has ADD. He don't have ADD, school is boring! It was boring, it's not as exciting as this. We have to make it more exciting, we have to mix curriculums to play basketball while you're doing math." He also criticized schools for not focusing on agriculture in his 2020 rally and during an interview with Lex Fridman. In 2022, he called for the history of the Holocaust and the mass genocide of 6,000,000 Jews in Nazi Germany to stop being taught in school. West supports sending federal funding to Christian organizations and restoring school prayer.

=== Gun control ===
During his only rally in 2020, West repeated a pro-gun-rights talking point—"Guns don't kill people, people kill people"—and expressed his opposition to gun control. West also made reference to the idea that women in Israel are trained to use firearms.

=== Prison reform ===
In September 2018, West called for the alteration of the Thirteenth Amendment because of a loophole that suggests it is legal to enslave convicts. During a meeting with Trump the following month, West called the Thirteenth Amendment a "trap door". In October 2019, West stated during a performance with the Sunday Service Choir that people were too busy discussing music and sports instead of focusing on a broken system that he claims imprisons "one in three African-Americans...in this country." The following month, West alleged that the media calls him "crazy" to silence his opinion, connecting this to the incarceration of African-Americans and celebrities. On his album Jesus Is King (2019), West discussed the Thirteenth Amendment, mass incarceration, criticized the prison–industrial complex, and connected three-strikes laws to slavery. In 2020, West said he was against capital punishment.

=== Welfare ===
In May 2018, West espoused the "Democratic plantation" theory that welfare is a tool used by the Democratic Party to keep black Americans as an underclass that remains reliant on the party. During a September 2018 special guest appearance on Saturday Night Live, after the show had already gone off the air, West alleged to the crowd that it was a Democratic Party plan "to take the fathers out [of] the home and promote welfare."

The following month, West alleged that homicide was a byproduct of a "welfare state" that destroyed black families. Jelani Cobb challenged West's claim in The New Yorker (at least as much as it applied to Chicago), arguing that "the catalysts for violence in that city predate the 'welfare state' and the rise of single-parent black households, in the nineteen-seventies." He pointed to findings from Chicago Commission on Race Relations regarding the violence of the Chicago race riots of 1919 and a 1945 study entitled Black Metropolis, published by sociologists St. Clair Drake and Horace Cayton, which Cobb wrote, "detailed the ways in which discrimination in housing and employment were negatively affecting black migrants." He also noted similar observations made by W. E. B. Du Bois in Philadelphia, in 1903.

== See also ==
- African American–Jewish relations
- African-American Jews
- Black conservatism in the United States
- Black Hebrew Israelites
- Black Judaism
- Christian democracy
- Mark Jacoby (political consultant)
- Perennial candidate
- Third party and independent candidates for the 2020 United States presidential election
- Third party and independent candidates for the 2024 United States presidential election
