= Vogart Crafts Corporation =

American embroidery transfer design manufacturer

Vogart Crafts Corporation, based in New York City, was best known for designing and manufacturing iron-on embroidery transfer designs.

== History ==
It was a United States corporation in business from about 1930 until around 1990, when its parent corporation, Pioneer Systems, Inc., caused it to file for bankruptcy under Chapter 11.

Eli J. Segal served as Vogart Crafts Corporation's CEO for a period of time, until his resignation in 1981.
