= Americorps Education Award =

The AmeriCorps Education Award is granted to members who are serving, part-time or full-time, in participating programs through AmeriCorps. After completing a term of service, AmeriCorps members are eligible to receive the Segal AmeriCorps Education Award to pay education costs at qualified institutions of higher education, for educational training, or to repay qualified student loans. The current maximum award is $7,395.00 as of March 7, 2025.

== Serve America Act of 2009 ==
The Serve America Act, implemented by Congress and effective October 1, 2009, made important changes to the Segal AmeriCorps Education Award. Changes include increasing the amount of the award by tying its value to the maximum Pell Grant, expanding its available uses, and authorizing transfer ability of the award for certain individuals. Though not all changes were implemented by October 2009, rules were finalized in 2010. Under the new act, the education award can be used to pay expenses while participating in an approved school-to-work program in addition to the previous uses towards qualified student loans and university education expenses. For certain AmeriCorps programs, AmeriCorps State and National and Silver Service education awards earned after October 1, 2009 may be transferred to members' children, grandchildren, or foster children as long as the member was at least 55 years of age when he or she enrolled and began service after that date.

There is also a process in place to develop new term limits for the Corporation for National and Community Service. As a current rule, members of AmeriCorps may only participate in AmeriCorps and receive an education award for a maximum of two years, although new rules may allow members of AmeriCorps serving part-time for a greater period of time. The AmeriCorps members may use their education award up to seven years after the end of their service, but the award will be taxed in the year in which it is used. However, members may qualify to use the Hope credit or the Lifelong Learning Credit which may provide significant tax relief.

== Qualified loans ==
The majority of post secondary loans backed by the federal government are eligible for repayment with these awards as well. There are a number of them, including:

- Stafford Loans
- Perkins Loan
- William D. Ford Direct Loans
- Federal Consolidated Loans
- Supplemental Loans for Students
- Health Education Assistance Loans
- Loans from state agencies, or state institutions of higher education

== Qualified schools ==
A school is qualified to accept the Segal AmeriCorps Education Award if it is a Title IV institution (this includes most colleges, universities, and graduate schools).
