= Mark Jacoby (political consultant) =

American businessman

Mark Jacoby is the owner of Let The Voters Decide (LTVD).

Jacoby came to national attention during Kanye West's 2020 Presidential Campaign. Jacoby's company LTVD was hired by West to manage the petitions drives around the nation to put West on the ballot for president.
