= David Eisner (chief executive) =

American business and political official

President and CEO of Repair the World
- In office January 16, 2013 – March 2019
- Preceded by: Jon Rosenberg
- Succeeded by: Cindy Greenberg

Chairman and CEO of the National Constitution Center
- In office November 18, 2009 – October 31, 2012
- Preceded by: Joe Torsella^{[a]}
- Succeeded by: Vince Stango

CEO of the Corporation for National and Community Service
- In office December 1, 2003 – December 1, 2008
- Preceded by: Leslie Lenkowsky
- Succeeded by: Patrick Corvington^{[b]}

Personal details
- Spouse: Lori
- Children: 4
- Education: Stanford University; Georgetown University (JD)
- a. Linda Johnson served as interim Chairman from the date of Torsella's resignation until Eisner's formal election to the post. b. Nicola Goren served as Acting CEO from December 2008 through October 2009, after Maria Eitel withdrew her name from consideration to be Eisner's permanent successor.

David Eisner is an American business and political official. He served as president and CEO of Repair the World, a non-profit organization that fosters and mobilizes Jewish-American volunteerism efforts from 2013-2019. Eisner was chief executive officer (CEO) of the Corporation for National and Community Service under George W. Bush until December 2008.

From 1997 until 2003, Eisner was a vice-president at AOL Time Warner. He was in charge of the company's charitable foundation. Other previous posts include acting as a senior vice president of Fleishman-Hillard International Communications and managing public relations at the Legal Services Corporation. He also served as press secretary for three Members of Congress. Eisner has also served on the boards of several national nonprofit organizations.

Eisner recently served as president and CEO of the National Constitution Center, a post he held from November 2009 to October 31, 2012. Eisner was the third CEO of the center since its opening in 2003.

Eisner became President & CEO of Convergence Center for Policy Resolution in April 2020 where he leads the organization's efforts to convene individuals and organizations with divergent views to build trust, identify solutions, and form alliances for action on critical national issues.

Eisner graduated from Stanford University and received his Juris Doctor degree from Georgetown University Law Center. He lives with his family in Philadelphia, Pennsylvania.

== Sources ==
- Official White House profile (archived)
- Appearances on C-SPAN
