= Faith-based organization =

Type of group centered around common trust, usually in social or religious values

A faith-based organization is an organization whose values are based on faith and beliefs, which has a mission based on social values of the particular faith, and which most often draws its activists (leaders, staff, volunteers) from a particular faith group. The faith the organization relates to does not have to be academically classified as religion. The term "faith-based organization" is more inclusive than the term "religious organization" as it also refers to non-congregation faith beliefs.

Faith-based organizations are grass-root organizations active locally but also on an international scale. Their funding comes from member donations, but they are also eligible for state or international grants.

Currently, this terminology is widely used in governmental, inter-governmental, and non-governmental settings. World Bank prepared a list of international faith-based organizations.

Policymakers in Germany have recognized the potential of cooperating with faith-based organizations.
