= List of volunteering awards =

Comprehensive list of volunteer awards

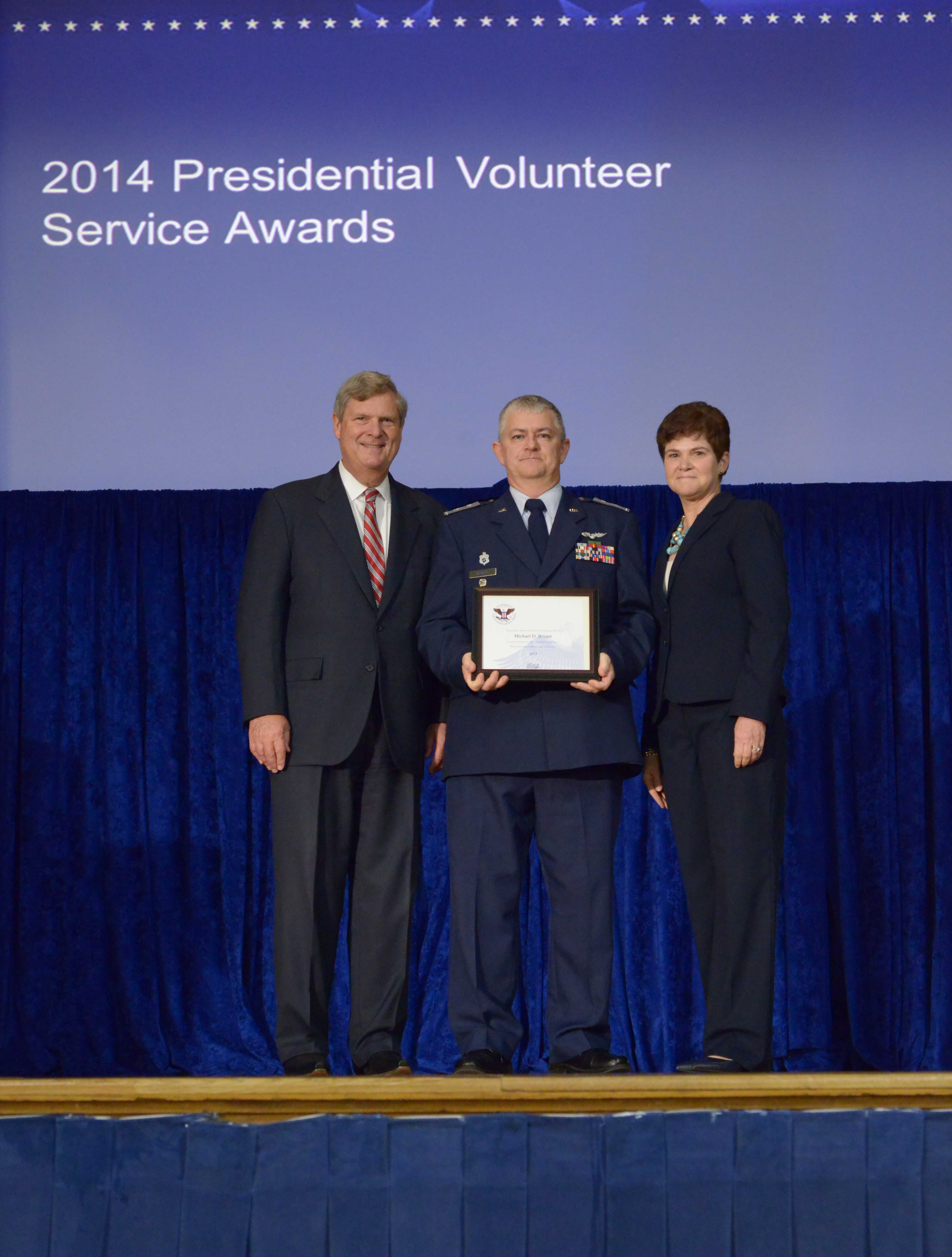
Michael D. Bryant receives President's Gold Volunteer Service Award (2014)

This list of volunteering awards is an index to articles about notable awards issued by organisations and governmental bodies honoring the contributions of volunteers (unpaid staff). Whereas many organisations honor volunteers who serve within those individual organisations, the awards listed here recognize volunteers contributing to a variety of nonprofit organisations, non-governmental organisations, charities, civil society organizations and communities.

== Global ==
- CNN Heroes are annual recognitions by CNN to honor individuals who make extraordinary contributions to help others.
- UNV Online Volunteering Award, presented annually, since 2000, to teams of online volunteers for their contributions towards the achievement of the Sustainable Development Goals (SDGs) through the Internet. A jury made up of external experts in volunteerism and development cooperation as well as United Nations Volunteers (UNV) representatives selects the winners. The Award presents an opportunity for both, online volunteers and organizations, to bring their online volunteering experiences and good practices to the attention of a global audience. In the run up to International Volunteer Day (IVD), anyone can vote for their favourite winners on the online volunteering service website. The team that gets the most votes is announced as the public's favourite on 5 December. Stories featured on the website illustrate the impact online volunteers have on the work of development organizations and convey how organizations express their appreciation to their volunteers for successful online collaboration.

== Australia ==
- Volunteering Australia is an award sponsored by National Australia Bank and presented annually since 1997.
- The NSW Volunteer of the Year Awards honor volunteers in New South Wales and were first presented in 2007.
- The Northern Territory Volunteer of the Year Awards honor volunteers in the Northern Territory and were first presented in 2011.
- The Queensland Young Volunteer Awards are Queensland-based awards recognizing contributions of volunteers from 12 to 25 years of age.
- The Queensland Volunteer Awards are held every May during National Volunteer Week by Volunteering Queensland. They acknowledge and honour the astonishing contribution and spirit of service of all Queensland volunteers and volunteer involving organisations. The awards are presented across six categories.
- The AAVA Volunteer Manager Award of Excellence was created by the Australasian Association of Volunteer Administrators (AAVA) in order to recognize outstanding contributions to volunteer management.

== Canada ==
- The Governor General's Caring Canadian Award is awarded annually by the Governor General of Canada to Canadian individuals or groups who have given extraordinary help or care on a volunteer basis.
- The Prime Minister's Volunteer Awards program consists of 17 awards in total, 2 at the national level and 15 at the regional level. Since 2010, the awards highlight best practices in community leadership and encourage partnerships across sectors. The goal of the awards is to inspire Canadians from all walks of life to find new ways of making a difference in their communities.
- The Flare Volunteer Award is sponsored by Flare magazine and is presented annually to six Canadian women 18 and older to honor outstanding volunteer achievements.
- The Canadian Business & Community Partnership Awards of the Imagine Canada charity are dedicated to Canadian companies that hold successful partnerships with volunteering organizations.
- The Department of Human Resources and Skills Development (RHDCC) of the Canadian government created the annual Thérèse Casgrain Volunteer Award to honor two volunteers for their exceptional work. The award memorialized feminist and politician Thérèse Casgrain (1896–1981). The award was discontinued in 2010.

== European Union ==
- The European Employee Volunteering Awards, which are co-funded by the European Commission, recognize European companies that hand down skills to volunteers, thus preparing them for later fully paid work.

== Hong Kong ==
- The Hong Kong Volunteer Award, which are awarded by the Agency for Volunteer Service in Hong Kong, recognize outstanding individual volunteers and group volunteers in serving the community locally and worldwide. Since April 2009, all awardees were invited to join the Hong Kong Volunteer Awardees Society that was established to pool the strength and experience of the Hong Kong Volunteer Award winners, to share ideas and experiences, for widespread of volunteerism to the community.
- The Volunteer Movement Award, which are awarded by the Social Welfare Department of the HKSAR government in Hong Kong, recognize committed individual volunteers and group volunteers in serving the community. Each year, gold award, silver award and bronze award are awarded to committed individual or group to encourage volunteerism.
- The Caring Magic Scheme, which is launched by the charity Hong Kong Caring Magic Circus, and the scheme awarded its Caring Magic Partners and its nominated Caring Magic Ambassadors in recognizing their committed services in passing on love and care in the community.

== India ==
- V-Awards is a national annual awards by UNV India, Ministry of Youth Affairs and Sports and UNDP India. This age group for every eligible applicant is 16-29 years. This award is given on International Volunteer Day to encourage the positive contribution made by the young people towards our society and to recognize their efforts.
- iVolunteer Awards is an annual award by iVolunteer, India to honor the contribution of volunteers and organisations who engage them. The Awards have the aim of inspiring more people to volunteer and establishing benchmarks on volunteering practices across India. Awards are given in four categories: Volunteer Hero category - for individuals, Leader in Volunteer Engagement - for organisations, youth champion - individual volunteers between the age group of 18–23, Leader in Employee Volunteering - recognise companies following the best practices to encourage employee volunteering. The award aims to recognise the doers from the NGOs and Corporate and convey the message to others toparticipate in this developmental transformation. The first iVolunteer Awards was held in Mumbai on 8 April 2013.

== Ireland ==
- The annual Volunteer Ireland Awards, established 2007, aim to recognise and celebrate volunteers on a national stage. This all-Ireland awards campaign is held on International Volunteer Day each December 5. President of Ireland Michael Higgins is the patron of the Volunteer Ireland Awards. Members of the public are encouraged to nominate someone they know from September each year, choosing from one of ten categories, honoring the different facets of volunteering work.

== United Kingdom ==
- The Flame of Hope Awards are Cancer Research UK's annual awards recognising the achievements of volunteers who have given their time to help beat cancer sooner.
- MV Awards are given by Volunteer Development Scotland to young people completing set numbers of hours of volunteering.
- Millennium Volunteers awards are given in Wales to young people completing a set minimum number of hours of volunteering. The scheme is run by the national youth volunteering initiative, GwirVol, funded mainly by the Welsh Government.
- The King's Award for Voluntary Service is a highly prestigious prize honoring volunteer groups.
- Volunteering England, a charity supporting volunteering, organises the Volunteering England's Gold Awards, aims at students in further and higher education. Instances of the awards are given by academic institutions based on Volunteering England guidelines.
- The Wales Volunteer of the Year Award is run by Wales Council for Voluntary Action and has awards in a variety of categories.
- Tenovus, a leading cancer charity offering support and advice to those affected by cancer, held their first Volunteer of the Year awards on 7 July 2011 at Cardiff Castle. They honoured the contribution made by volunteers throughout the organisation based on its values.
- The Macmillan Volunteer Award recognises volunteers who improve the lives of people affected by cancer.
- Manchester University launched a Community Service and Volunteer of the Year Awards scheme in 2010, recognising a student and a staff member addressing "disadvantaged groups or deprived communities".
- The Marsh Trust Award is given by the British Museum and "recognises best practice and the innovative ways in which volunteers work in museums and galleries to engage the public with collections."
- Castlereagh Borough Council - Mayor's Awards for Volunteering, launched in 2012, recognising the important role that volunteering plays in sustaining and developing communities within the Borough. Awards are issued to Adult Volunteers, Young Volunteers, Creative Arts, Community Relations and Cultural Diversity, Good Citizenship and voluntary groups that support volunteer development.
- City University London hosts an annual volunteer awards ceremony. In 2015 there were seven award categories.

== United States ==
- The Corporate Engagement Award of Excellence was established in 1993 by the Points of Light Institute. It acknowledges the efforts and merits of businesses for the spread of voluntary work. The organization also created the Points of Light Award for volunteers (individuals or groups) engaged in problem-solving tasks.
- Daily Point of Light Award http://www.pointsoflight.org/dailypointoflight
- The Do Something Awards were set up by the Do Something youth organization, honoring the efforts of young volunteers "to change the world".
- The Eagle Scout Award of the Boy Scouts of America, requires, among other challenges to young people under the age of eighteen, the candidate to demonstrate their leadership ability by devising, planning, organizing, and executing a substantial community service project to benefit a cause besides Scouting.
- The Gold Award of the Girl Scouts of the USA, recognizing the successful completion of a project that reaches beyond the Girl Scout organization and provides a sustainable, lasting benefit to the girl's larger community.
- The Good Neighbor Award is awarded annually by the National Association of Realtors to 10 Realtors who have made an extraordinary impact on the world through community service.
- The Gloria Barron Prize for Young Heroes is awarded to young people having organized some outstanding piece of voluntary work. It was created by American writer T. A. Barron, as a memory of his mother.
- The Harriet Naylor Distinguished Member Service Award from the Association for Volunteer Administration (AVA) was presented from 1981 through 2004 to an active AVA member, recognizing that person's activities that have strengthened both the association and the profession of volunteer resources management.
- HealthCare Volunteer annually recognizes a volunteer who provided outstanding medical, dental and surgical services to needy patients, and impoverished people worldwide.
- The Jefferson Awards for Public Service honors community and public service in America. The awards are presented on two levels: national and local.
- Kiwanis International awards its World Service Medal annually to an individual or organization that significantly enhances the quality of life of a noteworthy number of people. The award includes a $10,000 honorarium.
- The President's Volunteer Service Award is a national prize under the patronage of the President of the United States recognizing voluntary engagement. As of November 2012, it has been presented to more than 2.5 million individuals.
- The Prudential Spirit of Community Award is the largest US youth recognition program. It was established by Prudential Financial to honor outstanding volunteer service by people attending a secondary school.
- The VolunteerMatch Corporate Volunteer Awards are given each year by VolunteerMatch, a U.S.-based nonprofit organization, at its annual client conference. The awards recognize companies, brands and CSR program administrators who demonstrate "outstanding innovation, commitment and leadership in corporate community involvement."
- Women of Worth, a charitable organization sponsored by L'Oréal dedicated to families in crisis annually honors women who are engaged in voluntary work.
- The Wofford Awards were created in 2002 by Youth Service America in order to recognize the work of young volunteers in different categories. The name was chosen to honor former U.S. Senator from Pennsylvania Harris Wofford, and the award is sponsored by State Farm Insurance.
- Walter Payton NFL Man of the Year Award, presented annually by the National Football League (NFL) honoring a player's volunteer and charity work.
- Allstate AFCA Good Works Team, presented by Allstate, shines a spotlight on selflessness, volunteerism and community service by student-athletes and their coaches.
- SEC Community Service Team, honors players of various sports in member universities of the Southeastern Conference. The honor goes to players in recognition of their off-the-court/off-the-field volunteering and community service activities. Like an all-conference team or an all-American team, the Community Service Team is a hypothetical team - the members do not actually get together and play a game.
- Bart Starr Award, given annually to a National Football League (NFL) player who "best exemplifies outstanding character and leadership in the home, on the field, and in the community."
- NBA Community Assist Award, recognizes National Basketball Association (NBA) players regarding their community engagement, philanthropic activity and charity work. It is a monthly award, but season and offseason awards have also been given. In some cases multiple awards have been given in the same month.
- J. Walter Kennedy Citizenship Award, an annual National Basketball Association (NBA) award given since 1975 to a player, coach, or staff member who shows "outstanding service and dedication to the community."
- The Military Outstanding Volunteer Service Medal honors members of the military who perform substantial volunteer service to the local community above and beyond the duties required as a member of the United States Armed Forces.

== See also ==
- Global Youth Service Day
- International Volunteer Day
- International Year of Volunteers
- Join Hands Day
- Mandela Day
- MLK Day of service
- Mitzvah Day
- Random Acts of Kindness Day
- Sewa Day
- Make A Difference Day
- World Kindness Day
- List of awards for contributions to society
- Lists of awards
