= International Volunteer Day =

Annual observance on 5 December

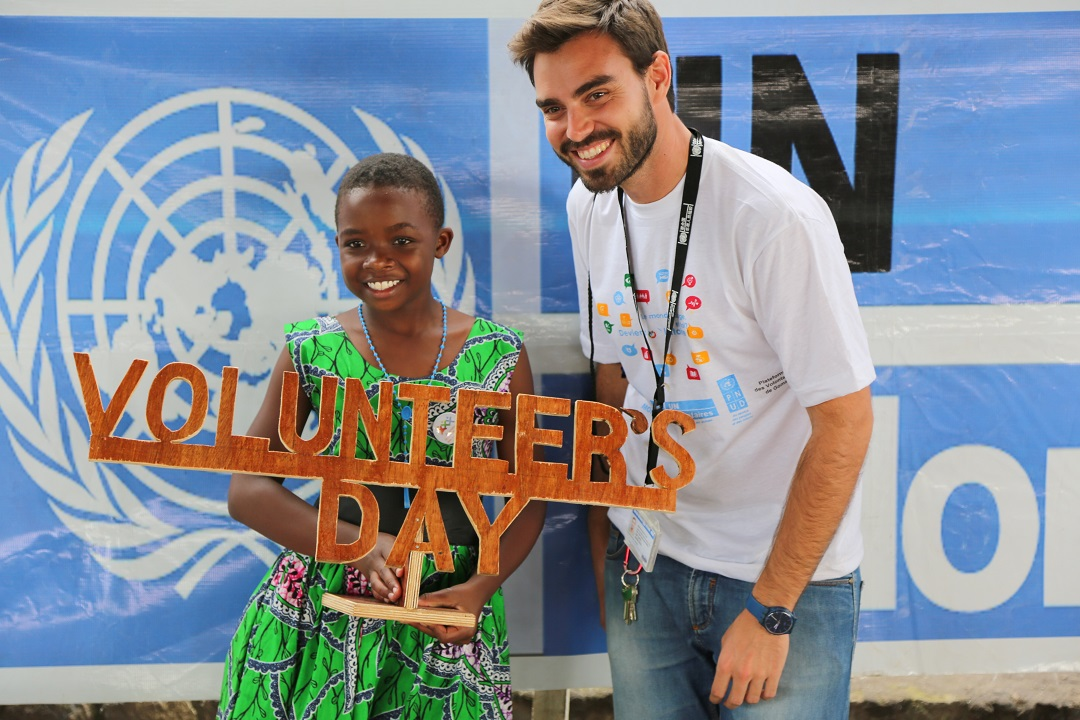
A schoolgirl in Congo presents a sculpture commemorating International Volunteer Day to one of the United Nations volunteers.

The International Volunteer Day for Economic and Social Development (5 December), more commonly referred to as International Volunteer Day (IVD), is an international observance mandated by the UN General Assembly in 1985. It offers an opportunity for volunteer-involving organizations and individual volunteers to promote volunteerism, encourage governments to support volunteer efforts, and recognize volunteer contributions to the achievement of the Sustainable Development Goals (SDGs) at local, national, and international levels. International Volunteer Day is marked and supported by the United Nations Volunteers (UNV). UNV coordinates a campaign to promote IVD every year.

== Background ==
The International Volunteer Day for Economic and Social Development was adopted by the United Nations General Assembly through Resolution A/RES/40/212 on 17 December 1985.

A look at United Nations Volunteers' International Volunteer Day Campaigns

IVD 2025 - "Every Contribution Matters"

IVD 2024 - No specific theme but highly centric on the Sustainable Development Goals

IVD 2023 – "If Everyone Did" centers on the power of collective action.

IVD 2022 – "Together, act now"

The theme for this IVD is solidarity though volunteering — "Together, act now".

IVD 2021 – "Volunteer now for our common future"

IVD 2020 – "Together We Can Through Volunteering"

IVD 2020 emphasized gratitude for volunteers and their efforts during the COVID-19 pandemic.

IVD 2019 – "For an Inclusive Future"

IVD 2019 focused on the diversity of volunteers and how volunteers themselves contribute to inclusion.

IVD 2018 – "Volunteers build Resilient Communities"

IVD 2018 celebrated volunteer efforts that strengthen local ownership and the resilience of the community in the face of natural disasters, economic stresses and political shocks. The event on 5 December 2018 focused on how volunteers can build resilient communities.

IVD 2017 - "Volunteers Act First. Here. Everywhere."

The focus of IVD 2017 was to recognize the positive solidarity of volunteers around the world who answer calls in times of crisis, helping save lives today and supporting those who want to continue living their lives with dignity tomorrow.

IVD 2016 - "Global Applause – give volunteers a hand"

Under this theme, IVD presented a round of global applause to celebrate volunteers everywhere and encouraged others to join in and contribute to peace and sustainable development.

IVD 2015 - "Your world is changing. Are you? Volunteer!"

The goal of IVD 2015 was to start a dialogue about how volunteerism is vital to the success of the Sustainable Development Goals (SDGs) and the 2030 Agenda.

IVD 2014 - "Make change happen, volunteer!"

The goal of IVD 2014 was to highlight the contribution of volunteers in engaging people from the grassroots in decision-making processes, ultimately creating spaces for participation that lead to stronger governance, social cohesion, peace and sustainable development.

IVD 2013 - "Young. Global. Active."

The goal of the event was to pay special tribute to the contribution of youth volunteers to global peace and sustainable human development, highlighting that young people act as agents of change in their communities.

IVD 2012 - "Celebrate volunteering"

The event celebrated its commitment and hope for a better world. The main focus of IVD 2012 was awareness of and recognition for volunteers and volunteer organizations.

== A focus on partnership and development ==
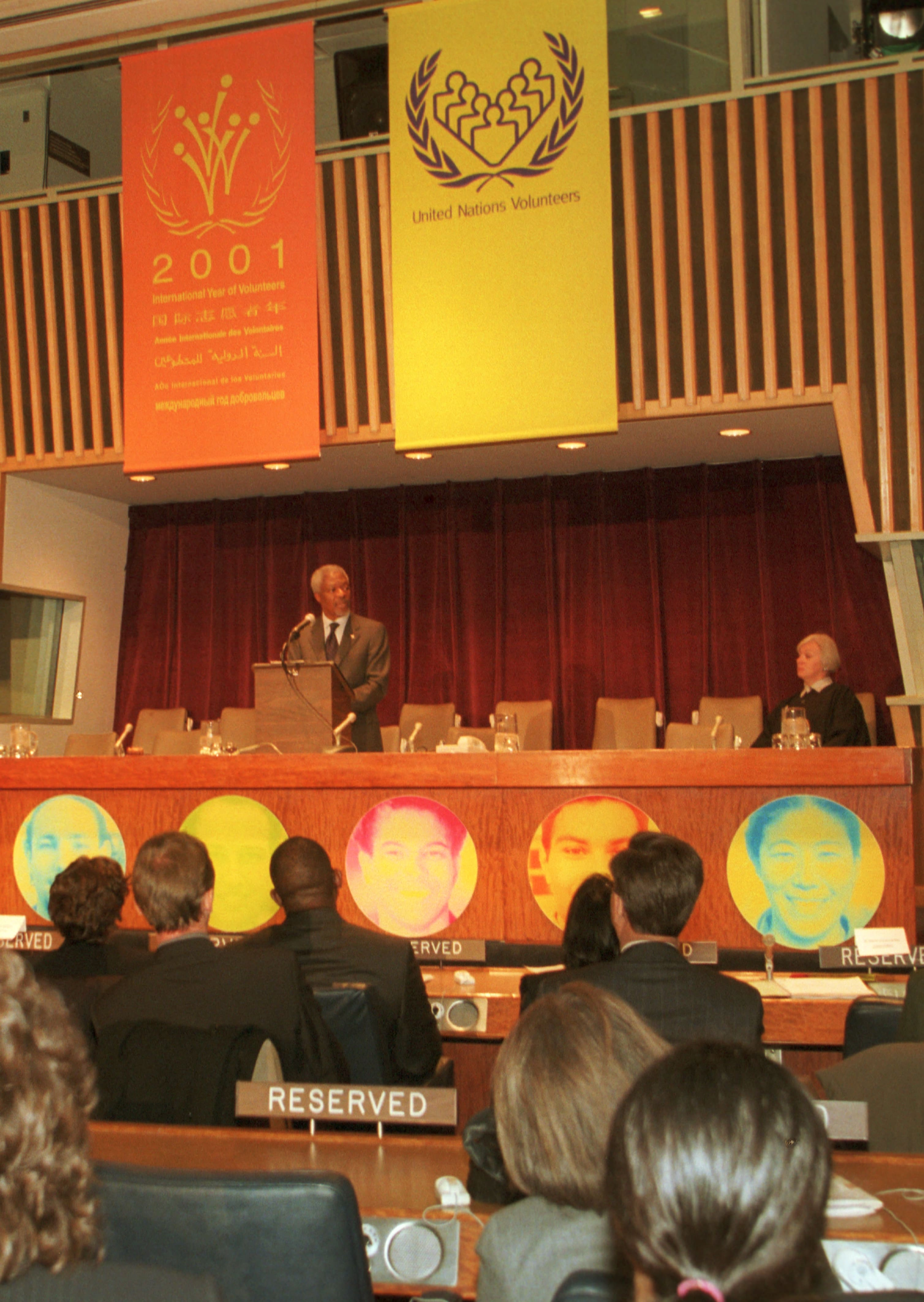
Kofi Annan speech on the International Year of Volunteers 2001

UN Volunteers, local volunteers, volunteer-involving organizations, youth organizations, and UN agencies attending the 2017 International Volunteer Day celebration in Nepal

Through the years, International Volunteer Day has been used strategically: many countries have focused on volunteers' contributions to achieving the Sustainable Development Goals, a set of time-bound targets to combat poverty, hunger, disease, health, environmental degradation and gender equality. ^{[1]}

International Volunteer Day (IVD) celebrates active volunteers and attracts new volunteers in the North and in the South, with a special focus on promoting South-South cooperation.

The organization of International Volunteer Day is generally the result of a partnership between the UN system, governments, volunteer-involving organizations and committed individuals. Representatives from the media or academia, foundations, the private sector, faith groups, and sports and recreational organizations are often involved too.

The General Assembly invited Governments to observe annually, on 5 December, the International Volunteer Day for Economic and Social Development (resolution 40/212 of 17 December 1985) and urged them to take measures to heighten awareness of the important contribution of volunteer service, thereby stimulating more people in all walks of life to offer their services as volunteers, both at home and abroad.

The United Nations General Assembly, in its resolution 52/17 of 20 November 1997, proclaimed 2001 as the International Year of Volunteers (IYV). The year was conceived to further the recognition of volunteers, facilitate their work, create a communication network and promote the benefits of voluntary service.

In 2001, the International Year of Volunteers, the General Assembly adopted a set of recommendations on ways in which Governments and the United Nations system could support volunteering and asked that they be given wide dissemination (resolution 56/38 of 5 December 2001).

The United Nations General Assembly, in its resolution 57/106 of 22 November 2002, called upon the United Nations Volunteers (UNV) programme to ensure that the potential of International Volunteer Day is fully realized.

On 18 December 2008, the General Assembly decided that on or around 5 December 2011, two plenary meetings of the sixty-sixth session of the General Assembly should be devoted to the follow-up to the International Year of Volunteers and the commemoration of its tenth anniversary (resolution 63/153).

== Online Volunteering Award ==
Traditionally, on International Volunteer Day (5 December), UNV calls for nominations and launches the UNV Online Volunteering Award. A jury made up of UNV representatives and external experts in volunteerism and development cooperation review the nominations and selects the winners.

The United Nations Volunteers (UNV) programme invites citizens worldwide to be inspired by the winner's stories and participate in the global voting for their favorite winner. The team that gets the most votes is announced as the public's favorite on the International Day of Happiness.

The purpose of the award is to recognize online volunteers' contributions towards achieving the Sustainable Development Goals, to showcase the many ways in which online volunteers can strengthen the capacities of organizations, and demonstrate the difference volunteers can make to peace and development projects by sharing their time, skills and expertise over the Internet.

UNV Online Volunteering Award Winners
Year of the Award	Winners	Public Favorite (If chosen)
2002	Adedoyin Onasanya (Nigeria) - HORIZON International (USA); Angelica Hasbun (Costa Rica) - People with Disabilities Uganda (Uganda); Cynthia Holland (Canada) - Reach Out International (USA/Guatemala); Javier Wilson (Nicaragua) - Nile Basin Society (Canada); Joanne K. Morse (USA) - Christian Rural Aid Network (Ghana); Laurie Moy (USA) - People with Disabilities Uganda (Uganda); Natalya Korobeynyk (Ukraine) - Gardarika (Russian Federation); Paula Santos Vizcaino (Uruguay) - La Leche League International (USA); Terry Rosenlund (USA) - Kenya AIDS Intervention/Prevention Project Group (KAIPPG) (Kenya/USA); Yvonne Swain (USA) - Overcomers Visionary Faith Centre (Kenya) / Learning and Development Kenya (Kenya)	
2003	Anne-Catherine Yon (USA) - World Computer Exchange (USA); Deborah D'Amico (Canada) - People with Disabilities Uganda (Uganda); Kelly (Xiaodong) Zeng (China/USA) - Business Information Centre Straldja (Bulgaria); Lela Rachman Talogo (Canada) - Pearls of Africa (USA); Mark Wireman (USA) - Lawyers without Borders (USA); Miodrag Zivkovic (Serbia and Montenegro) - Zartonk-89 (Armenia); Paul Fifen Chimy (Cameroon/France) - Education for Development (Vietnam); Raj Gopal Prasad Kantamneni (USA) - Freedom from Hunger (USA); Stanley Tuvako (Kenya) - Kenya AIDS Intervention/Prevention Project Group (Kenya/USA); Yasemin Gunay (Turkey) - Mgbala Agwa Youth Forum (Nigeria)	
2004	Beatriz Iglesias (Spain) - La red internacional pro niños de la calle (USA); Biswajit Dash (India) - People with Disabilities Uganda; Blandina Musvoto (Zimbabwe) - Mgbala Agwa Youth Forum (Nigeria); Claire Suzanne Holland (USA) - Bureau for Reconstruction and Development (Afghanistan); Flavia Trevisani (Italy) - Lawyers Without Borders (USA); George Okello Gopal (Kenya) - Centre for Research in Women's Health (Canada); Ian Foster (Australia) - Gwalior Children's Hospital Charity (UK); Kalyani Suresh (India) - Professional Education Organization International (PEOI); Maria Yvette Reyes (Philippines) - Mmanze Centre for Rural Development and Training (Uganda); Will R. Wallace (USA) - RESPECT International (Canada)	
2005	Ana Maria da F.M. Saravia (Brazil) - Shine a Light, la red internacional pro niños de la calle (USA); Carlos Jiménez (Spain) - UN Volunteers Egypt; Elizabeth and Tim Rose (Canada) - Childcare and Adoption Society Zambia; Haingonirina Angie Ramaroson (Madagascar/USA) - DatelineHealth-Africa Inc. (USA); Jay Martin (Australia) - UN Volunteers (UNV) Vietnam; Mohammad Ashaq Malik (India/Eritrea) - Nile Basin Society (Canada) + UN Volunteers (UNV) Syria; Charles Forrester (Australia), Kashif Kamran (Pakistan), Priscilla Lynch (USA), Taru Agarwal (India) - UN Volunteers Syria; Sandrine Cortet (France/USA) - PEOI (USA) + RESPECT International (Canada); Sonia Ignatova (USA) - Action Against Poverty International, Inc. (USA/Nigeria); Stephan Bren (USA) - Mgbala Agwa Youth Forum (Nigeria)	
2006	Ayan Humbert-Droz (Australia) - Native Planet (U.S.A.); Dieudonné Amisi Mutambala (D.R. Congo) - RESPECT Refugee Education Sponsorship Program (Canada); Edna Eufemio (Philippines) and Lakshmi Poorna (India) - Solidarity Tourism (Spain); Lourdes Sada (Spain) - Community Empowerment Collective Society (Canada) and PEOI, Professional Education Organization International (U.S.A.); Minh Vo (Viet Nam) - PEOI, Professional Education Organization International (U.S.A.); Rajaa Habeeb Abdullah Allwatiah (Oman) - HASCO, Help Afghan School Children Org (Austria); Raul Alberto Caceres (Colombia) - NABUUR (The Netherlands); Shane Messer (U.S.A.) - LWOB, Lawyers Without Borders (U.S.A.); Solomon Sackitey (Ghana) - DatelineHealth Africa Inc. (U.S.A.); Su Melser (Costa Rica) and Delia Tasso (Italy) - International Network for Bamboo and Rattan (China)	
2007	African Conservation Foundation Team - Lauriane Cayet and Magali Moreau; Bureau for Reconstruction and Development Team - Yin Mei Wong; Community Empowerment Collective Team - Luiz Claudio Correia dos Anjos; Conscious Generation Team - Deborah Hubscher; Lawyers Without Borders Team - Bonnie Taher; MAPU Association Team - Carmina Velasco and Silke Reichrath; RESPECT Team - Veronica Patience Fynn, Dr. Raphael Sadiwa and Kenneth Donahue; Shine a Light Team - Ludmila Cieszkowsky and Sara Gomes; UNDP International Poverty Centre Team - Mania Mirsli and Sabria Regragui Mazili; Youth for Technology Foundation Team - Danielle Brunin	
2009	Africavenir Team - Aline De Leener, Amandine Hourt, Andrea Rudin Montes de Oca, Hippolyt Fogaing, Jean Bosco Utuba, KayerguĂ Koulibaly, Tony Kouteh; Engineers Without Borders Team - Anne Marine Boubennec, Birgit Kann, Daniel Sturby, Hippolyt Fogaing, Karine Duval, Lee Knaggsi, Meiry Matsuda, Ruth Keene, Stéphanie Di Sano, Tanya Brown; Grace Foundation Nigeria Team - Ayesha Zaheer; Grace Association Pakistan Team - Aisha Mian, Jennifer Wells, Kalloimora Bzepam, Katie Simons, Laura Gamboa-Cavazos, Laura Riveni, Loai Farajallah, Paula Ellinger da Fonseca, Sehrish Rashid, Yvonne Nelson; Kitega Community Centre Team - Anne Ames, Dinnah Santos, Lisa Biasillo, Robert Gerstein Tiffany Shaw-Diaz, Vy Nguyen; New Life Team - Prajwal Baral; Shine A Light Team - Aida Ramos, Charles Essie Okoko, Christian Farin, Irena Kotarska, Khalid Ahmad, Liora Engel-Smith, Molombe Sammah Mbua, Nicolas López, Rania Zabaneh, Sabine Juli, Sara Gomes, Sathish Kumar, Snezana Andric, Yomna Yasse; Teach A Man To Fish Team - Loai Farajallah; Working To Empower Team - Adriana Palacios; Young People We Care Team - Chelsea Wyatt, Daniela Georgieva, Haddy Sarr, Kwame van Eijndhoven, Laurene Graziani, Stella Mihailova, Tizeta Getaneh, Wei Wang	Africavenir Team
2010	Association Against Women Export Team - Edwin Cuenco; Engineers Without Borders Team - Abdou Maiga, Hind Salama, Kokou Edoh Adabe; Global Hand Team - Dante Jiang, Qiuming Liao, Xinxin Sun, Zijian Zhang; Kitega Community Centre Team - Anup Tiwari, Bibiana Restrepo, Edith Marie Garingalao, Halima Tahirkheli, Kylie Dirks, Paula Montoya, Pierre Talla, Radha Taralekar, Vy Nguyen; Maventy Health International Team - Dan Frankowski; Nabuur Team - Maria Zandt; Positive Nett-Works Team - Akanksha Gulia, Priyanka Ohri, Ritika Verma, Samarpita Mukherjee, Tarun Chawla; UNESCO World Heritage Marine Programme Team - Joanna Borg; Volunteer Partnerships for West Africa Team - Rui Oliveira; Young People We Care Team - Nan Zhang and Sumit Singh	
2011	Comber Foundation Team - Alicia Dorr, Jessica Anne Wise, Sarah Shirley, Tara Green, Eleanor Wragg, Marta Jankovic, Kari Kitiuk, Mary McKeown; Delta Women Team - Paola Brigneti; Fundació Catalunya Voluntària Team - Álvaro Martín, Annalisa Foglia, Dina M. Mansour, Gayatri Navaratnam, Karolina Ginalska, Katerina Papadopoulou, Laura Sánchez, Paola Cavallari, Peter Weekley, Porzia Persio, Ülgen Türkmen, Yadín Acedo; Goodness and Mercy Missions Team - Akanksha Shukla; Kitega Community Centre Team - Anup Tiwari, Bibiana Restrepo, Caroline Joseph, Halima Tahirkheli, June Aluoch, Kara Kristine Manso, Mona Saleh, Punam Chowdhury, Radha Taralekar, Reena Rae, Vy Nguyen, Yann Say-Liang-Fat; La ferme aux arbres de Dekese Team - Alex Théodore Kambou, Ali Siribié, Bernard K. Allouan; Leaders of Tomorrow International Team - Maria Jakimovska; UN OCHA Team - Ajibola Oseni, Akua_Acheampong, Avi_Sharma, Charlotte_Morgan, Chrysoula_Vafeiadaki, Estella Reed, Farshid Raminfar, Ibrahim Oyekanmi, Michael Kasolo Kigozi, Mohamed Hegab; UNV Namibia / National Planning Commission of Namibia Team - Edmund Paul Kalekyez; Volunteer Partnerships for West Africa Team - Yolanta Cwik	
2012	Association of African Entrepreneurs Team - Kirthi Jayakumar, Natacha Borri, Pavithra Rajan, Petroc Wilton, Rita Sheryl, Sowmyan Jegatheesan; Association for Global Humanists and Ethics Pakistan Team - Bushra Ferdous Khan; ASTRA Anti Trafficking Action Team - Dawn Brozek, Lucija Zigrovic; Delta Women Team - Kirthi Jayakumar; Fondation Joseph the Worker Team - Sandrine Legros; PCs4Kids Team - Brad Roberson; Positive Nett-Works Team - Annabel Lim, Den Quinsay, Lola Zhang, Lucia Hlopkova; UNDP Brazil Team - André Demetrio, Camila Pessoa, Carmen Lucia Midaglia, Eric Bragion, Fernanda Luísa Pereira, Gustavo Mattos Trindade, Isadora Barison, Marcella Rossi Motta, Marcelle Antunes Alves, Nina Carvalho, Rafael Martins Dias, Raphaella Pinheiro, Ruth Ferreira Valverde; UNHCR Regional Support Hub Team - Pat Redmond; Youth for Technology Foundation Team - Dominique Torres, Lina Klemkaite, Mayra Juárez Denis	UNDP Brazil Team
2013	Ann Foundation Team - Abhishek N., Aruna Babu, Arundhathi Harikrishna, Bushra Ferdous Khan, Cheryl Stafford, Debjani Sengupta, Deepa Chandrashekar, Deepa Kumar, Pavithra S., Pavithra Rajan, Renganayaki Nambi, Rahul Muralidhara, Saleshni Chaudhary; Asociación Aprendo Contigo Team - Leonardo Parrado Varón; Association of African Entrepreneurs Team - Aksa Bilal, Chioma Okwudiafor, Daniel Benson, David Arnett, Diego Lopez, Eleana Velentza, Fanny Bessem, Fortunato Novelliere, Gabriela Campos, Hamsini Srinivasan, Happy Mukama, James Carstensen, Kirthi Jayakumar, Lontsi Fomekong, Md. Nahidul Islam, Nidhi Modani, Prasad Ramachandran, Sharique Hassan Manazir, Shudzeka Eric Tewiy, Slawosz Fliegner, Wendy Chan, William Kin; Colombian Red Cross Team - Leonardo Parrado Varón, Susana Mammola; Delta Women Team - Elaheh Zohrevandi, Emmanuel Owobu, Isaac Owusu, Kirthi Jayakumar, Suman George, Usha Shenoy; Fondation Joseph the Worker Team - Camille Seccaud, Elizabeth Fernandez-Begault, Saley Djibo, Virginie Martins de Nobrega, Renaud d'Herouville; Global Civil Initiatives Team - Alexander Harris, Ashwinkumar Dakshinamurthi, Neha Jain, Sangeeta Pandey; Noble Missions for Change Initiative Team - Agnieszka Joanna Stolarczyk; The People's Open Access Education Initiative Team - Mridula Bhat; UN DESA Team - Beth deBeer, Lea-Kristin Martin, Lilani Seram, Louis-Marie Ngamassi, Prasida Khanal, Shaopeng He	Association of African Entrepreneurs Team
2015	Association des Agriculteurs Professionels du Cameroun Team - Komivi Messan Akakpo, Alexandra Carraz-Ceselli, Alexandra Lepin, Andréanne Roux, Claudine Lecuret, Frédéric Millogo, Jonathan Sharp, Laura Guien, Réjean Tremblay, Silvia Muiña, Winnifrede de Schaetzen; Fundación de Comunidades Vulnerables de Colombia Team - Anahi Silva Tosca; Hunger Reduction International Team - Prerna Bakshi; Seeds Theatre Group Team - Angie Bojtler, Etan Nechin, Kathy Connolly, Robyn Santa Maria, Zara Qaiser; UN Women Team - Jaslin Kalsi, Gesu Antonio Baez, Laura Cook	Hunger Reduction International Team
2017	Lulu Ileho Poultry Group Team - Zuzana Filipova; Simuka Africa Youth Association Team - Bianca Dayrit; The International Paralympic Committee Team - Keon Richardson; The Red Elephant Foundation Team - Alka Mann, Luqman Mani, Prathyusha Munjuluri; UNICEF Global Innovation Centre Team - Anamaria Cabrera Rodriguez, Claudia Lisette Ramirez Monterrosa, Emmanuelle Grandaud, Loïc Druenne, Lorena Belenky, Nouriatou Ntieche, Paula Alejandra Ballesteros Campos	Simuka Africa Youth Association Team

== See also ==
- Association for Volunteer Administration
- Association of Leaders in Volunteer Engagement
- Global Youth Service Day
- Good Deeds Day
- International Year of Volunteers
- Join Hands Day
- List of awards for volunteerism and community service
- Make A Difference Day
- Mandela Day
- Mitzvah Day
- MLK Day of service
- National Philanthropy Day (USA and Canada)
- National Public Lands Day (USA)
- NetDay
- Peace Day
- Random Acts of Kindness Day
- September 11 National Day of Service (9/11 Day)
- Sewa Day
- Subbotnik Day
- United Nations Volunteer
- World Humanitarian Day
- World Kindness Day
