= National Philanthropy Day =

National Philanthropy Day is an annual observance on November 15 that is designated by the Association of Fundraising Professionals (AFP) to celebrate charitable activities in the form of donated financial, in-kind, and volunteering support.

It is celebrated with blog postings by AFP that highlight outstanding charitable activities, as well as luncheons and awards throughout the United States, as well as other places in North and South America, by different AFP chapters.

== History ==
The Association of Fundraising Professionals' (AFP) National Philanthropy Day was created in 1986 by philanthropist Douglas Freeman of Orange County, California, and formalized by then-U.S. President Ronald Reagan, who signed a proclamation recognizing November 15 as National Philanthropy Day in the US.

In 2012, the Government of Canada signed the National Philanthropy Day Act into law, declaring November 15 as the annual celebration of National Philanthropy Day as well.

== Overview ==
National Philanthropy Day is registered with the United States Patent and Trademark Office and the U.S. Department of Commerce. The official National Philanthropy Day song, "Now More Than Ever," was written by Marvin Hamlisch. The day has been celebrated by AFP chapters across the US, including San Diego, California, Toledo, Ohio, Chattanooga, Tennessee, and Detroit, Michigan.

== See also ==
- Association for Leaders in Volunteer Engagement
- Association for Volunteer Administration
- Global Youth Service Day
- Good Deeds Day
- International Council of Voluntary Agencies
- International Volunteer Day
- International Year of Volunteers
- Join Hands Day
- List of awards for volunteerism and community service
- Make A Difference Day
- Mandela Day
- MLK Day of service
- Mitzvah Day
- National Public Lands Day (USA)
- NetDay
- Random Acts of Kindness Day
- September 11 National Day of Service (9/11 Day)
- Sewa Day
- World Kindness Day
