= Shmuel Slavin =

Israeli politician (born 1953)

- שמואל סלבין

18th Director General of the Ministry of Finance
- In office 1997–1998
- Minister: Yaakov Neeman
- Preceded by: David Brodet
- Succeeded by: Benzion Zilberfarb

Personal details
- Born: October 16, 1953 (age 72) Israel
- Party: Likud
- Spouse: Talia Friedman
- Children: 5
- Education: Hebrew University of Jerusalem

Shmuel Slavin Hebrew: שמואל סלבין; born October 16, 1953, is an Israeli economoist who served as the Director General of the Ministry of Finance and Ministry of Labor, Social Affairs and Social Services. He currently serves as chairman of the Sella Capital real estate fund.

== Early life ==
Slavin grew up attending a Chabad yeshiva for his primary education until the age of 17. He joined the IDF after graduation and was wounded during his service in the Golani Brigade. He later served as an instructor and became a member of their artillery corps. From 1977 to 1979, he earned his B.A. in economics and international relations at the Hebrew University of Jerusalem. In 1980, he completed his master's degree and then began undergraduate studies in history and philosophy.

== Career ==
=== Public sector ===
While he was earning his master's degree, he worked as an economist for the Ministry of Interior, and later served as an economic advisor for the Ministry of Energy. From 1983 to 1986, he was the CFO of a tourism company, and went on to serve as an economic advisor directly to Prime Minister Yitzhak Shamir and was appointed to be the Director General of the Ministry of Labor and Social Affairs. From 1987 to 1990, he was a representative for the Labor Courts of Israel. Starting in 1989 until 1992, he was the Vice Chairman for the Cable and Satellite Broadcasting Council. From 1991 to 1992, he returned to serve as en economic advisor to the Prime Minister.

He was appointed the Deputy General of the Ministry of Finance in 1997, replacing David Brodet after his retirement but resigned eleven months into his role. He served in many public positions in the late 90s and 2000s, including: Chairman of the Jerusalem Theatre (1994–1995) and of the Jerusalem Khan Theatre (2001–2002). Since 2005, he has led a committee on the implementation of the Gavison-Medan Covenant, a doctrine in Israel which proposes to maintain its status as a Jewish state while not engaging in religious coersion. In 2018, he joined as a member of the Haredi Institute for Policy Research.

In the 1999 Israeli general election, Slavin ran for office under the Center Party, where he placed 15th on their list. He participated in the Likud primaries in the 2006 Israeli legislative election, only placing 30th on the list of candidates.

In 2002, he served as chairman of a committee appointed by Amir Peretz to audit the sale of Shikun & Binui to Arison Investments following claims that it had been sold for 1/2 of its total value. His conclusion was that while an auction should have been held to reach a higher price, the price was a fair one to have been sold for. In June 2020, he was a member of the Planning and Budget Committee for the Council for Higher Education in Israel.

=== Private sector ===
Taking his first major stint in the private sector he served as Deputy CEO for the holding organization of Yedioth Ahronoth, and was its representative for Hot Telecommunications, as well in Reshet's bid for Channel 2. He was responsible for the network's Yedioth Tikshoret. Between 1994 and 1997, he was the CEO of Mifal HaPais, Israel's national lottery.

After the completion of his position at the Ministry of Finance, his turn to the private sector led him to serve under various companies. He served as the CEO of Mehadrin Real Estate from 1998 to 2001 and chairman of Histadrut's Properties Company from 2001 to 2004.

== Personal life ==
Slavin currently resides in Jerusalem, along with his wife Talia (née Friedman) and their five children.
