= Good Deeds Day =

International day of community service

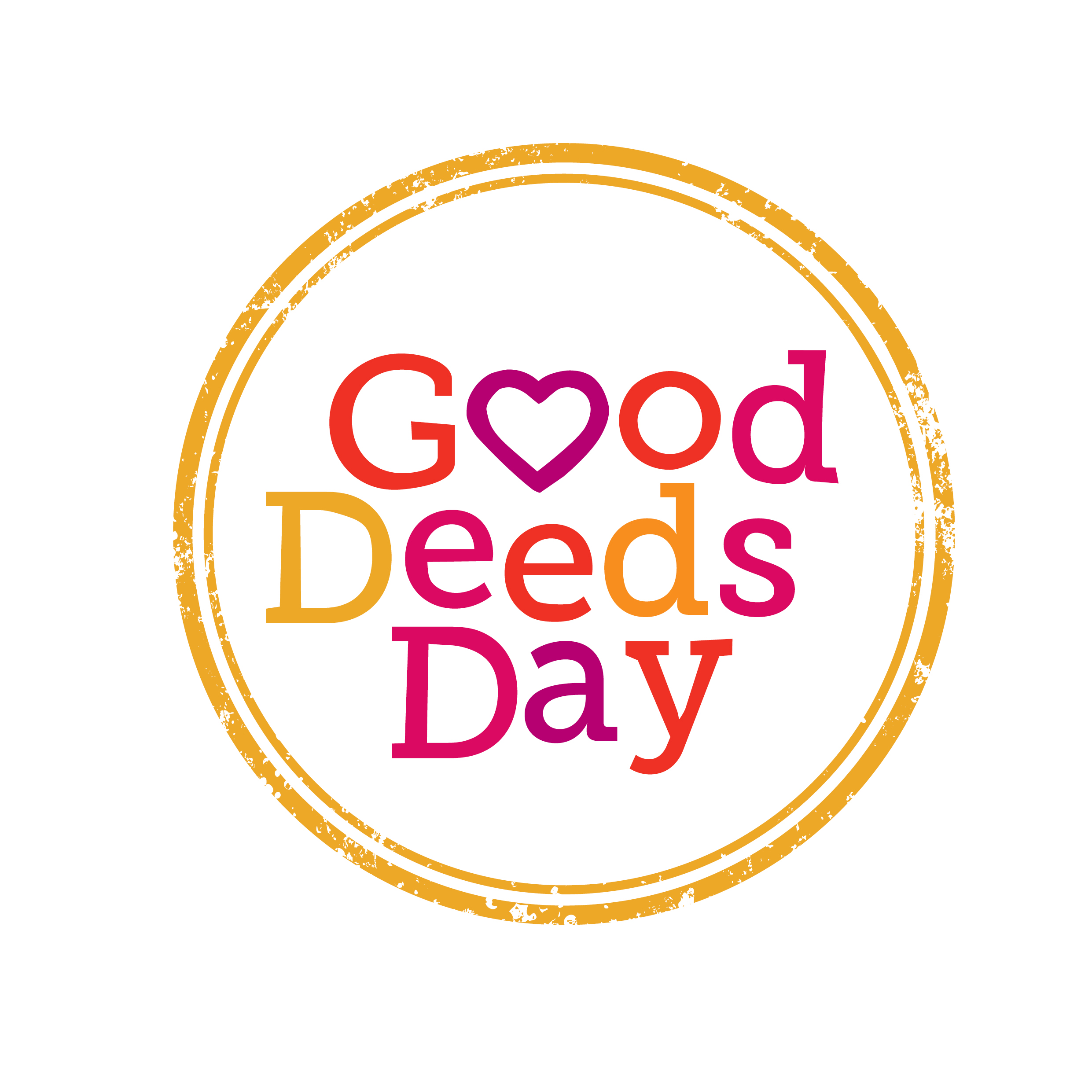
- Frequency: Annual
- Date: March - April
- Initiator: Shari Arison
- Countries: 108
- Participants: 3,900,000

Good Deeds Day (Hebrew: יום המעשים הטובים) is an annual international day of community service started in 2007 as an initiative of the Israel-based nonprofit organization Ruach Tova. The international day of volunteering started in 2007. Its mission is to unite people from around the world in doing good deeds for others and the planet.

== Background ==
Ruach Tova, in cooperation with businesswoman and philanthropist, Shari Arison, and The Ted Arison Family Foundation, launched the first Good Deeds Day in 2007. The first year saw 7,000 volunteers complete 130 projects in Israel; in 2023, 4.3 million people across 110 countries participated in Good Deeds Day.

Speaking about the day, Arison said:

I believe that if people will think good, speak good and do good, the circles of goodness will grow in the world. Good Deeds Day has become the leading day of giving and this year individuals, school children, students, soldiers and employees from many businesses are joining in for the annual Good Deeds Day with the aim of doing a good deed for others.

== Around the world ==
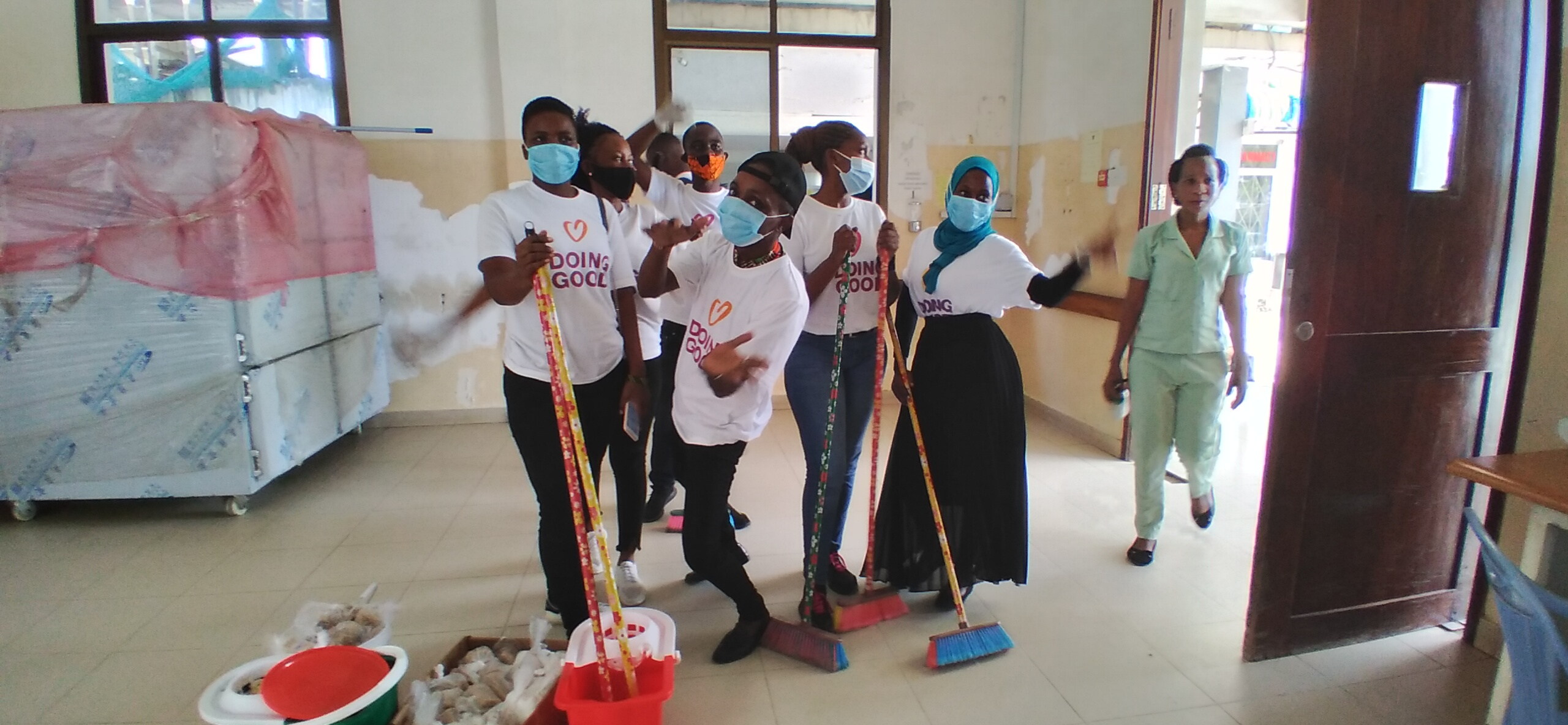
Youth commemorating Good Deeds Day by donating cleaning facilities to Hospital in Dar es Salaam (Tanzania)

In Taiwan, Good Deeds Day collaborated with TAVE (Taiwan Association for Volunteer Effort) to create major citywide activities in Kaohsiung City, Taiwan in 2016. Taiwan's vice president, Chen Chien-jen, and Kaohsiung's Mayor, Chen Chu, were among the government officials honoring the day in 2016. Taoyuan City also hosted citywide activities, arranged by Taoyuan City Volunteer Service Association and other partnering organizations.

One of the biggest collaborations in Europe include SPES (Associazione Promozione e Solidarietà) in Italy, who organized a major Good Deeds Day event in Rome in 2016. Good Deeds Day invited runners in the Rome Marathon to join the “Roma Fun Run” and visit the Good Deeds Day fair of non-profits at the finish line.

== See also ==
- Civic engagement
- Community service
- Global Youth Service Day
- Join Hands Day
- Make A Difference Day
- Mandela Day
- MLK Day of Service
- Mitzvah Day
- National Philanthropy Day (USA and Canada)
- National Cleanup Day
- National Public Lands Day (US)
- National Volunteer Week (US)
- Random Acts of Kindness Day
- September 11 National Day of Service (9/11 Day)
- World Cleanup Day
- World Kindness Day
