= Join Hands Day =

Join Hands Day is the first Saturday in May. It is a national volunteer day and annual event sponsored by the American Fraternal Alliance.

== Background ==
The day was launched by what was then called America's Fraternal Benefit Societies in 2000, in partnership with Points of Light Foundation. It is meant to have a focus not just on volunteering, but also on developing youth and adult relationships.

For the first two years of Join Hands Day, organizations were asked to register their Join Hands Day projects via the official web site. In some years, a certain number of groups were chosen to receive a cash award for the beneficiary of their project or another cause and a physical award, and were recognized at the National Fraternal Congress of America (NFCA) annual conference. It was not always on the first Saturday in May; the 2001 day was held on June 16.

Organizers of Join Hands Day offer participants ideas for group volunteering events that can bring adults and youth together in community service, such as repairing bicycles to give disadvantaged children and teaching bicycle maintenance, collecting chairs of various shapes and sizes to paint and then auction for a worthy cause, or repairing gravestones and improve landscaping in a cemetery and documenting historic grave sites.

== See also ==
- Association for Volunteer Administration
- Benefit society
- Civic Engagement
- Community Service
- Global Youth Service Day
- Good Deeds Day
- International Council of Voluntary Agencies
- International Year of Volunteers
- List of North American fraternal benefit orders
- Make A Difference Day
- Mandela Day
- MLK Day of service
- Mitzvah Day
- National Philanthropy Day (USA and Canada)
- National Public Lands Day (USA)
- National Volunteer Week (USA)
- Random Acts of Kindness Day
- September 11 National Day of Service (9/11 Day)
- Sewa Day
- Single Marine Program Days of Service
- Subbotnik
- World Kindness Day
