= Arison Investments =

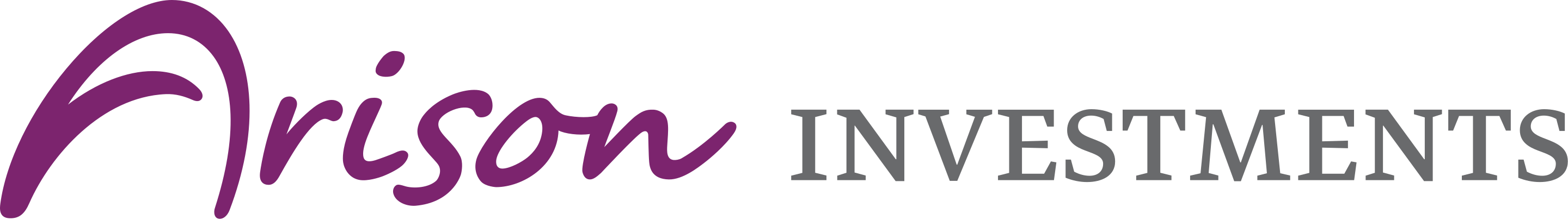
- Company type: Holding company
- Founded: 1991
- Founder: Ted Arison
- Owner: Shari Arison
- Website: arisoninvestments.com

Arison Investments Ltd., the business arm of the Arison Group, is an international holding company owned by Shari Arison. The company's portfolio includes food tech, healthcare, mobility, education, real estate, AI/robotics, and circular economy.

== History ==
Arison Investments is led by Shari Arison since 1999. It was established in 1991 by Ted Arison, founder of Carnival Cruise Lines.

Until 2018, the company was the major shareholder and owner of some of the pillars of the Israeli economy, including Bank Hapoalom, Shikun & Binui, and Salt of the Earth, which were sold in a series of acquisitions in 2018 and 2019.

As of 2022, Arison Investments holds 5.62% of Bank Hapoalim shares, and its diversified impact investments are realized across asset classes, from traditional equities to innovative companies. Its strategy is aligned with broader social and environmental goals, with sustainable impact investing in Food Tech, Healthcare, Mobility, Education, Real Estate, AI/Robotics, and Circular Economy.

=== Mergers and acquisitions ===
In 1991, Arison Investments acquired Orlev and Orbond, a gypsum walls company.

In 1993, Arison Investments bought Nirlat.

In 1994, the company acquired LR Electronics and Oryam Construction.

In 1995, Arison Investments acquired shares in Bank Hapoalim and in Eurocom Mobile.

In 1996, Arison Investments acquired the infrastructure and real estate conglomerate Shikun & Binui, and sold Orlev.

In 1997, Arison investments acquired Eurocom Communications and Mirabilis. That same year, the controlling interest of Bank Hapoalim was sold to the Arison-Dankner Group and other partners.

In 1998, the company bought Bio Medical Instruments, and sold Orband, Nirlat, Oryam, and Mirabilis.

In 2004, Shari Arison launched the Shari Arison Family Office (SAFO) in Miami, and Efrat Peled was appointed its CEO (and Chairman in 2009).

In 2005, Arison Investments sold Eurocom Communication and Eurocom Mobile.

In 2007, Arison Investments became the controlling shareholder of Shikun & Binui, by acquiring shares from 441 employees. That same year, Arison Investments became the controlling shareholder of Bank Hapoalim, and acquired the controlling stake at Israel Salt Industries, transforming it into a private company and renaming it Salt of the Earth.

In 2008, Arison Investments launched Miya, an international water company specializing in efficient urban water systems, founded by Shari Arison to secure the abundance of fresh water in the world.

In 2009, Shari Arison launched The Doing Good Model, marking the fruition of her vision of Doing Good and her values-based approach to business and philanthropy, which has been implemented in the public and private companies at the Arison Group since 1997.

In 2010, Arison Investments sold Bio Medical Instruments.

In 2012, Shari Arison Family Office (SAFO) diversified its investments into a range of impact investments.

In 2017, Shari Arison established The Doing Good Model company, which integrates values into the heart of businesses and organizations, appointing David Arison CEO of this organization.

In 2018 Arison Investments sold Shikun & Binui to the Saidoff Group, after 22 years in which it held the company’s controlling interest. That same year, and after more than 20 years as its major shareholder, Arison Holdings sold some of its Bank Hapoalim shares and ceased to hold the controlling interest in the bank.

In 2019, Arison Investments sold Salt of the Earth to Fortissimo Capital, and Miya, its international water company, to the global private equity fund Bridgepoint. That same year, it also sold LR Electronics.

Since 2019, Arison Investments has continued diversifying its portfolio of impact investing, focusing on strategic themes that create positive change in accordance with global sustainable guidelines outlined the UN's SDG goals, ESG, and DGM (The Doing Good Model).
