= Global Youth Service Day =

Annual event

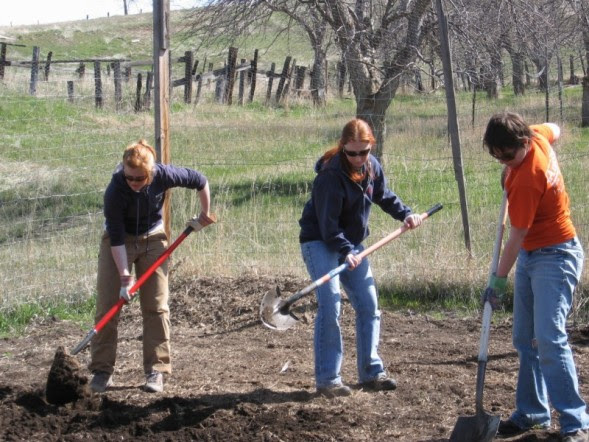
- Volunteers maintaining the Moon-Randolph Homestead in Missoula, Montana for Global Youth Service Day 2008
- Begins: Friday
- Ends: Sunday
- Frequency: Annual
- Location: Global

Global Youth Service Day (GYSD), originally launched and known as National Youth Service Day in the United States, is a coordinated annual event which voluntary gathers young people around the world in conducting community service, service learning, and youth voice activities that benefit their communities, their countries, and the world. Activities are organized in more than 100 countries each April to help mark the celebrations, and engage millions, making it the largest annual celebration of young volunteers.

In 2024, the event took place April 26-28. Coordinated by Youth Service America together with a coalition of organizations, GYSD's primary sponsor is Hershey with contributing sponsorship from Charles Stewart Mott Foundation, All State Foundation, and SODEXO Foundation. More than 2,000 youth organizations around the world participate each year. A variety of organizations with national reach across the United States engage in National Youth Service Day activities, including the United States Conference of Mayors, Woodmen of the World, and Habitat for Humanity. A variety of organizations have been accredited with administering the day, including Global Youth Action Network, Youth Service America, and Points of Light Foundation.

Speaking about Global Youth Service Day, Jane Goodall commented, "I have often said that every individual counts, every individual has a role to play, and every individual makes a difference. Global Youth Service Day proves it." Kofi Annan said that, "Volunteers are some of our most valued partners, and Global Youth Service Day celebrates the efforts of the youngest of them."

== See also ==
- Association for Leaders in Volunteer Engagement
- Association for Volunteer Administration
- Civic Engagement
- Community Service
- Good Deeds Day
- International Volunteer Day
- International Year of Volunteers
- Join Hands Day
- List of awards for volunteerism and community service
- Make A Difference Day
- Mandela Day
- MLK Day of service
- Mitzvah Day
- National Philanthropy Day (USA and Canada)
- National Public Lands Day (USA)
- National Volunteer Week (USA)
- Random Acts of Kindness Day
- Subbotnik
- September 11 National Day of Service (9/11 Day)
- Sewa Day
- World Kindness Day
