= Micky Arison =

American billionaire and businessman

- מיקי אריסון
- Arison in 2006
- Born: June 29, 1949 (age 76); Tel Aviv, Israel
- Education: University of Miami (did not graduate)
- Occupations: Chairman of Carnival Corporation & plc Owner of the Miami Heat
- Spouse: Madeleine Arison
- Children: 2
- Parent(s): Ted Arison; Mina Wasserman
- Relatives: Arison family
- Awards: 3× NBA champion (as owner) 2006, 2012, 2013 with Heat

Micky Arison (Hebrew: מיקי אריסון; born June 29, 1949) is an Israeli-American billionaire businessman and chairman of Carnival Corporation, the world's largest cruise operator. From 1979 until 2013, he was also the company's chief executive officer. Arison is also the owner of the NBA's Miami Heat, which under his ownership has won three NBA Championships.

== Early life and education ==
Arison was born on June 29, 1949, in Tel Aviv, Israel, the son of Ted Arison, co-founder of Carnival Corporation. His sister is Shari Arison. He also has a brother, Kames Arison.

Arison attended the University of Miami School of Business at the University of Miami but left school to become a sales representative for Carnival Corporation.

== Career ==
=== Miami Heat ===
Arison has been the owner of the Miami Heat since 1995. During his ownership, Arison hired Pat Riley as the team's head coach (and later team president) and under Arison's ownership the team has won three NBA championships (2006, 2012, and 2013).

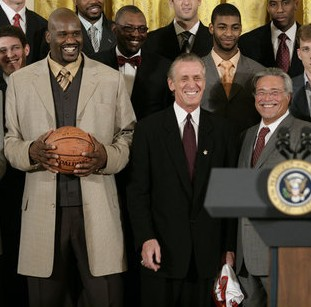
Arison (bottom right) with the Miami Heat in 2006 at the White House

=== Compensation and wealth ===
In 2009, he earned $7,201,110, which included a base salary of $880,000, a cash bonus of $2,206,116, stocks granted of $3,618,481, and other compensation totaling $496,513.

As of March 2025, Arison's wealth was calculated at $8.65 billion.

In 2024, he was ranked at #137 on the Forbes 400 list of wealthiest individuals.

== Personal life ==
Arison is married to Madeleine Arison, and they have two children. Their son Nick Arison is chief executive officer of the Miami Heat.

Arison owns two 200-foot (61 m) yachts which he uses as homes.

In January, 2025, Arison sold his condo residence in Bal Harbour, Florida for $5.8 million, or $1,134 per square foot.

== Awards and honors ==
- Three-time NBA Champion (as owner of the Miami Heat)
- Arison has been announced as a 2025 inductee of the Naismith Memorial Basketball Hall of Fame as a contributor.

Sporting positions
Preceded by Ted Arison	Miami Heat principal owner 1995–present	Incumbent
