= Shari Arison =

American-Israeli businesswoman

- שרי אריסון
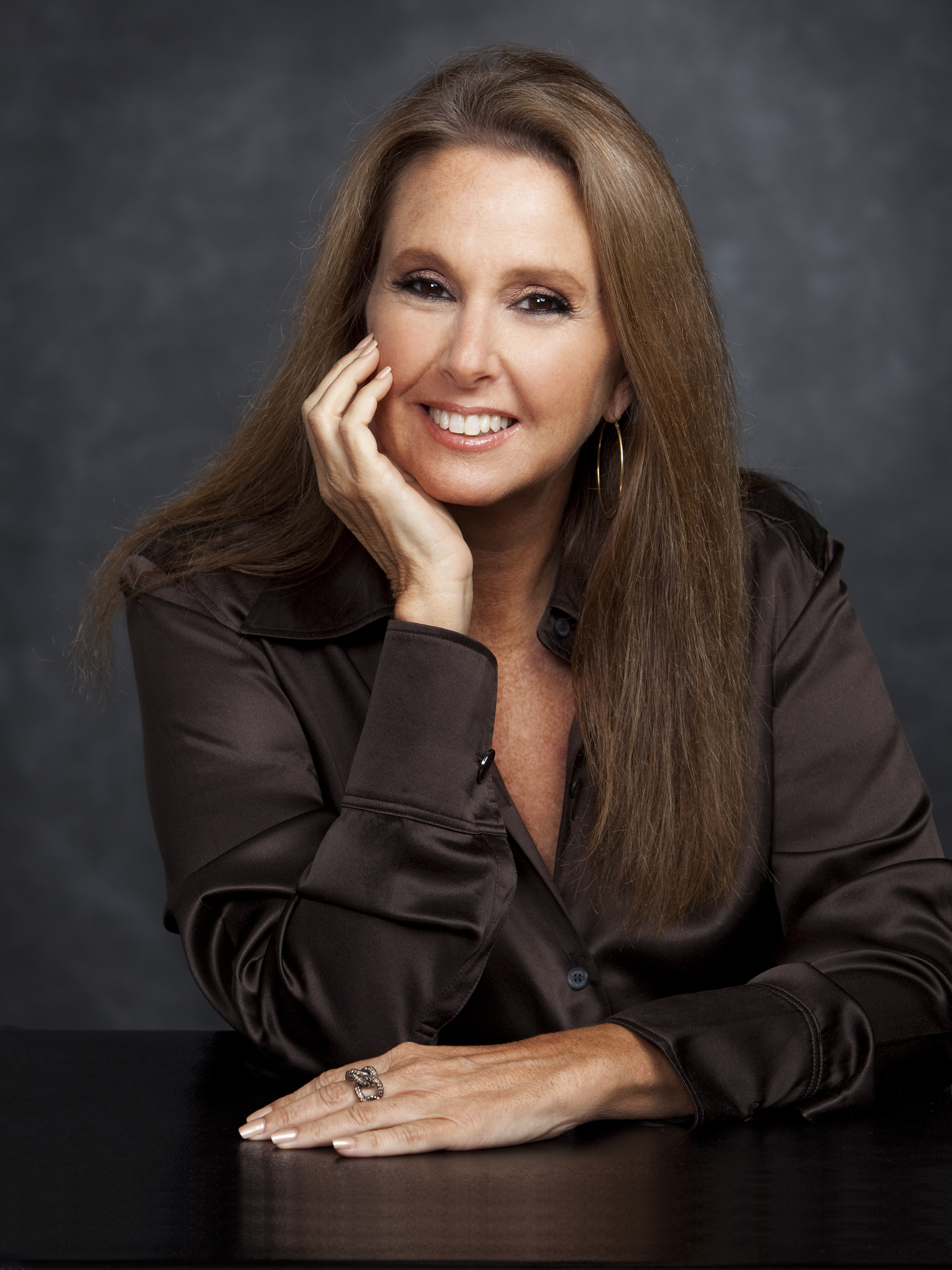
- Arison in 2009
- Born: September 9, 1957 (age 68); New York City, U.S.
- Citizenship: American-Israeli
- Education: Miami Dade College Did not graduate
- Occupations: Businesswoman and philanthropist
- Spouses: Jose Antonio Sueiras (divorced) Miki Dorsman (divorced) Ofer Glazer (divorced)
- Children: four --three with Sueiras --one with Dorsman
- Parent(s): Ted Arison; Mina Arison Sapir
- Relatives: Micky Arison (brother)
- Website: www.shariarison.com

Shari Arison (Hebrew: שרי אריסון; born September 9, 1957) is an American-born Israeli businesswoman and philanthropist. She is the owner of Arison Investments, which consists of several companies, and of The Ted Arison Family Foundation, which comprises several philanthropic organizations that operate as its subsidiaries. She was the controlling shareholder of Bank Hapoalim for 21 years until she sold some of her shares in November 2018. She was also an owner of Shikun & Binui for 22 years, sold to the Saidoff Group on August 6, 2018.

As of 2007, according to Forbes, she is the richest woman in the Middle East, and the only woman to be ranked in the region's top 20 of the richest people. As of January 22, 2024, Forbes listed Arison's net worth at US$4.4 billion, ranking her 672 on the Billionaires list and she was ranked eighth among the top wealthiest people in Israel.

== Early life ==
Arison was born in New York City, and is the daughter of the businessman Ted Arison, the founder of Carnival Cruise Lines, and Mina Arison Sapir. She has an older brother, Micky. In 1966, her parents divorced, and she moved to Israel to live with her mother. At the age of 12 she returned to the US to live with her father, and five years later she returned to Israel in order to enlist in the Israel Defense Forces. In 1999, Arison's father died and bequeathed her 35 per cent of his possessions.

== Career ==
In 2003, she was the target of protests after 900 workers were fired from Bank Hapoalim.

In March 2009, Arison sponsored Israel's third annual "Good Deeds Day" in which her non-profit organization, Ruach Tova, inspired thousands of Israelis to get involved in volunteering across the country. As part of the event, which took place near Tel Aviv, a Palestinian youth orchestra performed in an hour-long concert in honor of Holocaust survivors. They played classical Arabic tunes and songs of peace, but upon the group's return to Jenin, local Arab authorities condemned the orchestra's leader for her "exploitation of the children for political purposes." The event garnered worldwide media attention. Following the concert to celebrate "Good Deeds Day", the orchestra conductor was expelled from her hometown of Jenin.

Arison was awarded the America–Israel Friendship League's Partners for Democracy award in 2010, for her contribution to promoting the economies of Israel and the United States.

== Business activities ==
Arison owns or is active in various businesses and philanthropic organizations, including:

- Arison Investments
- The Ted Arison Family Foundation
- Bank Hapoalim
- Shikun & Binui
- Goodnet.org — an online media publication featuring "Good News" stories

== Personal life ==
Arison has been married and divorced three times. Her first husband was Jose Antonio Sueiras, an officer on one of the ships owned by her father; they had three children. Her second husband was basketball player Miki Dorsman; they had one child. Her third husband was Ofer Glazer.

== See also ==
- Arison family
