= Arison family =

Israeli-American business family

The Arison family is a Romanian-Israeli-American business family. Moshe and Sarah Arison immigrated to Ottoman Palestine from Romania in 1882, and were among the founders of the town of Zikhron Ya'akov. Their eldest son was Meir Arison, who was the father of Theodore Arison (later Ted Arison) and two daughters, Aviva and Rina.

The family of Ted Arison are his first wife Mina Arison (who became Mina Sapir after marrying her second husband, Yekutiel Sapir), their two children Micky Arison and Shari Arison, Ted's second wife Marilyn B. Arison, and her son Michael Arison who Ted later adopted, and their spouses.

== Notable members ==
- Ted Arison (1924–1999), Israeli businessman, was born as Theodore Arison in Tel Aviv in 1924, in Mandatory Palestine. He served in the Israel Defense Forces and participated in the 1948 Arab-Israeli War. After his army service he moved to the United States and became a business man. He founded Carnival Cruise Lines which earned him a fortune as it grew to be one of the biggest in the world. Over time he became one of the richest people in the world. In 1990, he returned to Israel. He contributed large sums of money to the state of Israel to build hospitals and to establish charity organizations. In 1997 he acquired from the state of Israel (as part of a government privatization plan) most of the controlling shares in Bank Hapoalim, the biggest bank in Israel.

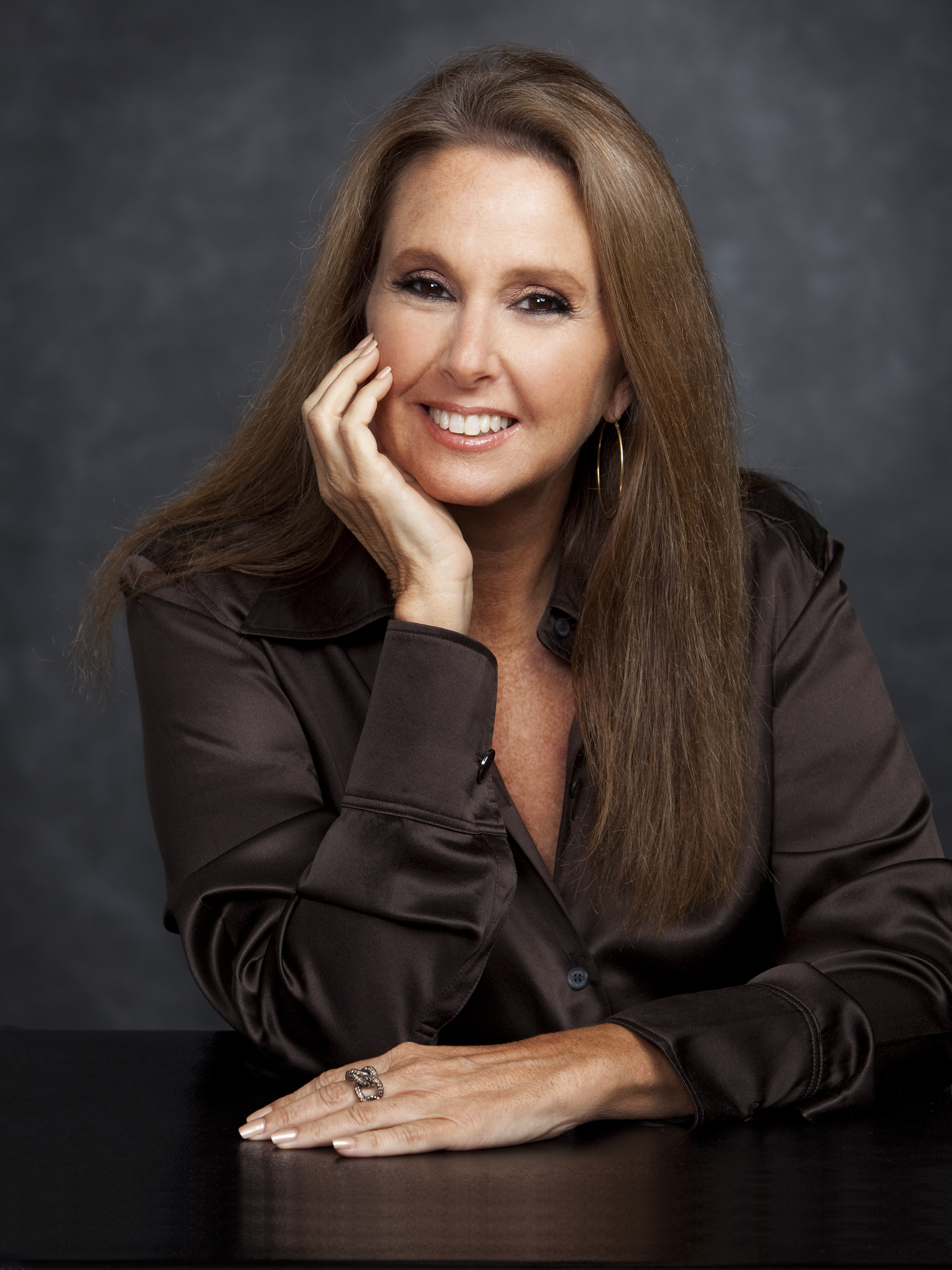
Shari Arison

- Micky Arison, born in 1949, is Ted and Mina Arison's son. He was the Chief Executive Officer of Carnival Corporation plc until August 2013, and continues to be the Chairman of the Board of Directors. He has developed Carnival into a global cruise company and one of the largest vacation companies in the world. The portfolio of leading cruise brands includes Carnival Cruise Lines, Holland America Line, Princess Cruises and Seabourn Cruise Line in North America; P&O Cruises, Cunard Line and Ocean Village in the United Kingdom; AIDA in Germany; Costa Cruises in southern Europe; Iberocruceros in Spain; and P&O Cruises in Australia. He is also the owner of the NBA's Miami Heat. He has two adult children.
- Shari Arison, born in 1957 in New York City, is Ted and Mina Arison's daughter. She immigrated to Israel with her father and, after his death, inherited 35% of his fortune. Her primary inheritance was her father's investments in Israel, among them, the shares of Bank Hapoalim. She left Israel for a brief period following her father's death, and moved to Miami. News reporter Shelly Yachimovich said Shari was motivated by greed in her move out of Israel. Shari Arison accused Yachimovich of slandering her. In 2004 she and her then husband Ofer Glazer returned to Israel. As of 2011, she is Israel's richest woman.

== Business holdings and organizations ==
- Ted Arison Family Foundation
- Arison Holdings
- Arison Investments
- Bank Hapoalim
- Carnival Corporation & plc
- Carnival Cruise Lines
- Miami Heat
- National Foundation for Advancement in the Arts
- Norwegian Cruise Line
