= Martin Luther King Jr. Day =

U.S. holiday, 3rd Monday of January

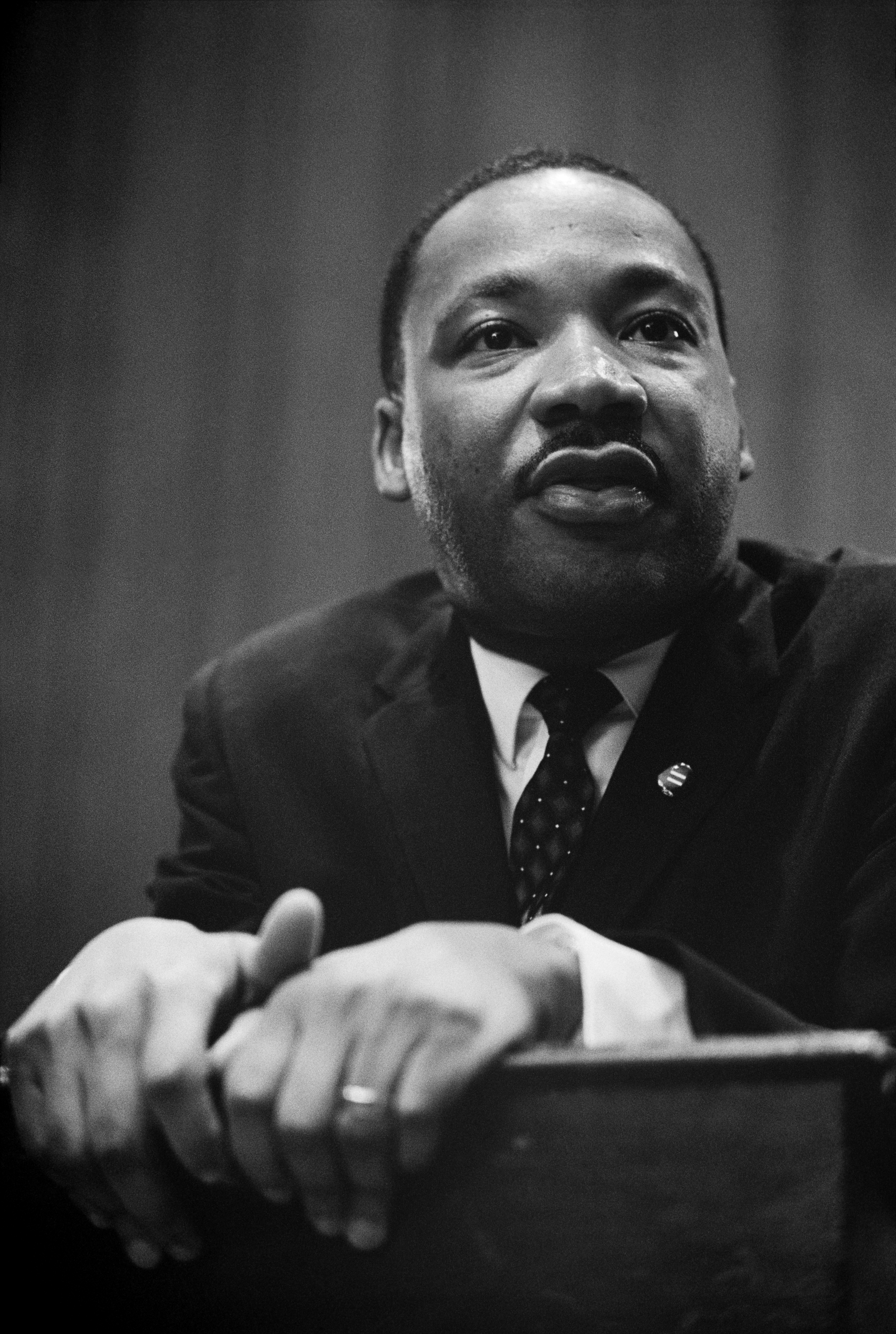
- King in 1965
- Official name: Birthday of Martin Luther King, Jr.
- Also called: MLK Day, King Day, Reverend Dr. Martin Luther King Jr. Day
- Type: Federal
- Date: Third Monday in January
- 2025 date: January 20
- 2026 date: January 19
- 2027 date: January 18
- 2028 date: January 17
- Frequency: Annual
- First time: 1986; 40 years ago

Martin Luther King Jr. Day (officially Birthday of Martin Luther King, Jr., and often referred to shorthand as MLK Day) is a federal holiday in the United States observed on the third Monday of January each year. King was the chief spokesperson for nonviolent activism in the civil rights movement, which protested legalized racial discrimination in federal and state law and civil society. The movement led to several groundbreaking legislative reforms in the United States.

Born in 1929, Martin Luther King Jr.'s actual birthday is January 15, which in 1929 fell on a Tuesday. The earliest Monday for this holiday is January 15 and the latest is January 21. The Monday observance is similar for those federal holidays which fall under the Uniform Monday Holiday Act.

The campaign for a federal holiday in King's honor began soon after his assassination in 1968. President Ronald Reagan signed the holiday into law in 1983, and it was first observed three years later on January 20, 1986. At first, some states resisted observing the holiday as such, giving it alternative names or combining it with other holidays. Official observance in each state's law as well as federal law occurred in 2000.

== History ==
=== Proposals ===
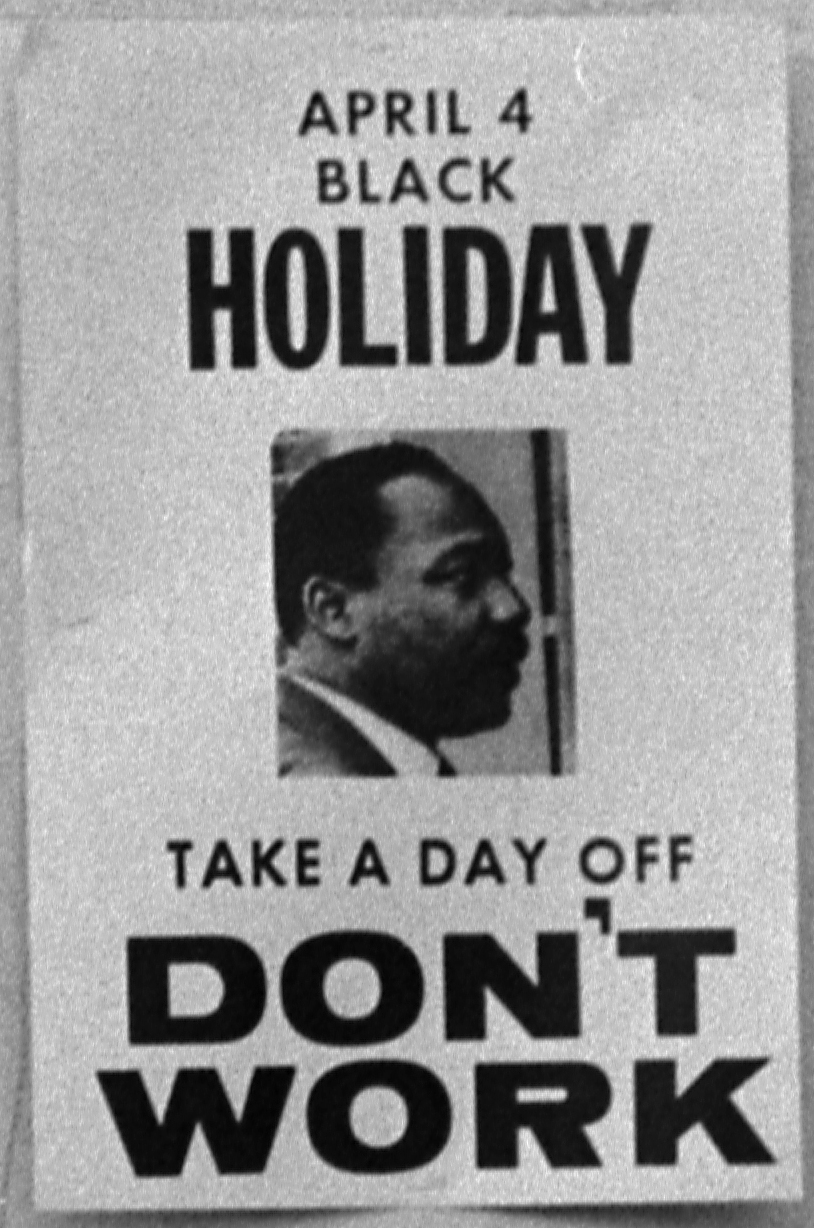
A sign in 1969, promoting a holiday on the anniversary of King's death

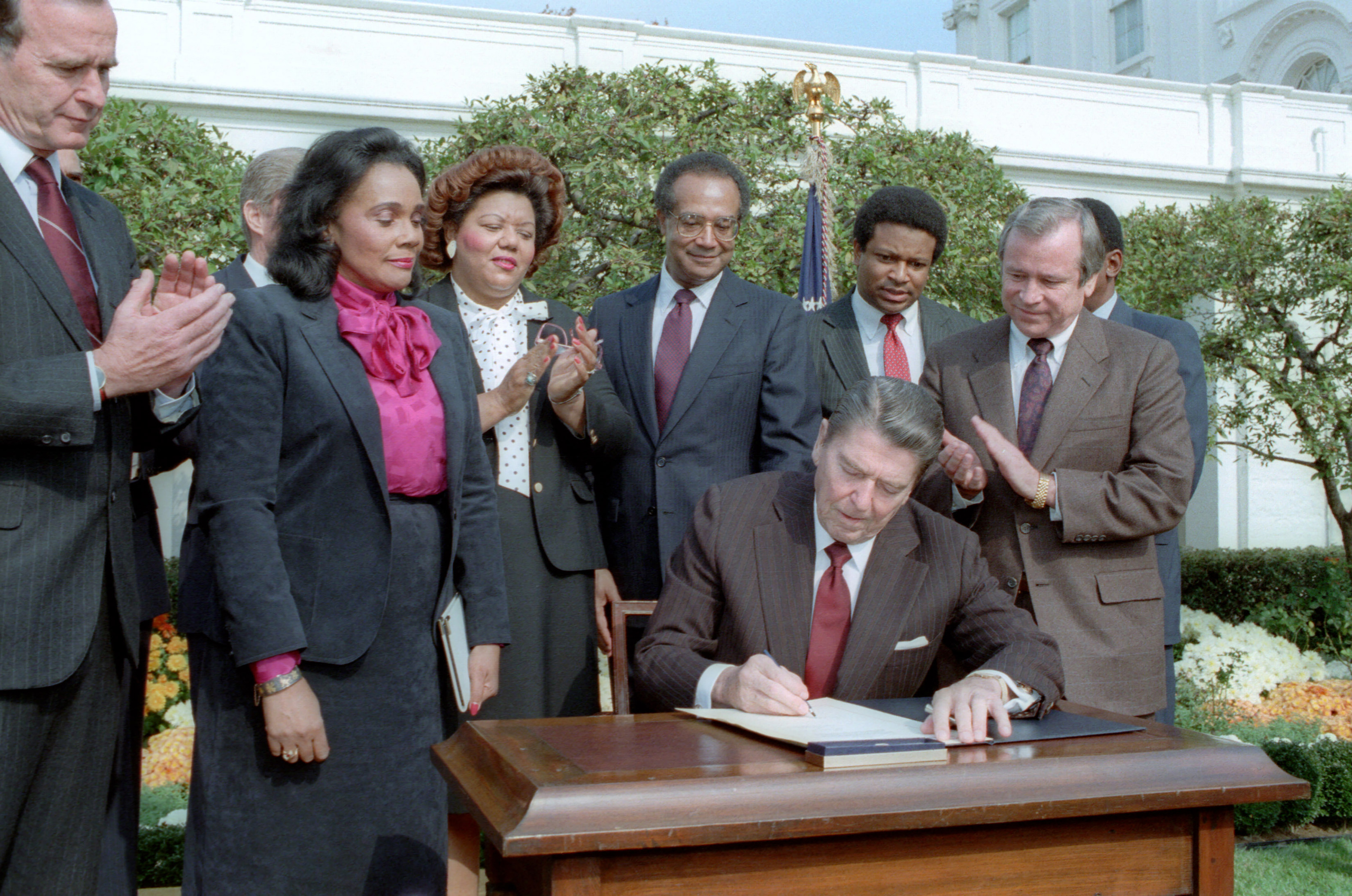
Ronald Reagan and Coretta Scott King at the Martin Luther King Jr. Day signing ceremony

The initial idea of Martin Luther King Jr. Day as a holiday was promoted by labor unions in contract negotiations. After King's death, Representative John Conyers (a Democrat from Michigan) and Senator Edward Brooke (a Republican from Massachusetts) introduced a bill in Congress to make King's birthday a national/official holiday in 1968. The bill first came to a vote in the U.S. House of Representatives in 1979. The House held a vote to amend the bill so that the holiday would be the third Sunday in January, rather than the Monday.

The House voted 207–191 against the amendment, as the bill's original sponsors called the amendment "unacceptable". Two of the main arguments mentioned by opponents were that a paid holiday for federal employees would be too expensive and that a holiday to honor a private citizen would be contrary to longstanding tradition, with King never holding public office. Only two other figures have national holidays in the U.S. honoring them: George Washington and Christopher Columbus.

Soon after, the King Center turned to support from the corporate community and the general public. In 1980, musician Stevie Wonder released the single "Happy Birthday" to popularize the campaign, and hosted the Rally for Peace Press Conference in 1981. Six million signatures were collected for a petition to Congress to pass the law, termed by a 2006 article in The Nation as "the largest petition in favor of an issue in U.S. history".

Senators Jesse Helms and John P. East, both North Carolina Republicans, led the opposition to the holiday and questioned whether King was important enough to receive such an honor. Helms criticized King's opposition to the Vietnam War and accused him of espousing "action-oriented Marxism". Helms led a filibuster against the bill and on October 3, 1983, submitted a 300-page document to the Senate alleging that King had associations with communists. Democratic New York Senator Daniel Patrick Moynihan declared Helms' document a "packet of filth", threw it on the Senate floor, and stomped on it.

=== Federal passage ===
President Ronald Reagan initially opposed the establishment of the holiday, stating in a letter to former New Hampshire governor Meldrim Thomson that he believed the momentum for establishing it to be "based on an image, not reality." When asked to comment on Helms' accusations that King was a communist, the president said "We'll know in thirty-five years, won't we", referring to the eventual release of FBI surveillance tapes that had previously been sealed.

But on November 2, 1983, Reagan signed a bill into law, proposed by Representative Katie Hall of Indiana, to create a federal holiday honoring King. The final vote in the House of Representatives on August 2, 1983, was 338–90 (242–4 in the House Democratic Caucus and 89–77 in the House Republican Conference) with 5 members voting present or abstaining. The final vote in the Senate on October 19, 1983, was 78–22 (41–4 in the Senate Democratic Caucus and 37–18 in the Senate Republican Conference), both veto-proof margins. The holiday was observed for the first time on January 20, 1986. It is observed on the third Monday of January.

The bill also established the "Martin Luther King, Jr. Federal Holiday Commission" to oversee observance of the holiday. In May 1989, Coretta Scott King, King's wife, was made a member of this commission for life by President George H. W. Bush.

=== State passage ===
Although the federal holiday honoring King was signed into law in 1983 and took effect three years later, not every U.S. state chose to observe the January holiday at the state level until 1991, when the New Hampshire legislature created "Civil Rights Day" and abolished its April "Fast Day". In 1999, New Hampshire became the last state to name a holiday after King, which they first celebrated in January 2000 – the first nationwide celebration of the day with this name.

In 1986, Arizona Governor Bruce Babbitt, a Democrat, created a paid state MLK holiday in Arizona by executive order just before he left office. In 1987, his Republican successor Evan Mecham, citing an attorney general's opinion that Babbitt's order was illegal, reversed Babbitt's decision days after taking office. Later that year, Mecham proclaimed the third Sunday in January to be "Martin Luther King Jr./Civil Rights Day" in Arizona, albeit as an unpaid holiday. In 1988, this proposal was rejected by the state Senate.

In 1990, Arizona voters were given the opportunity to vote on giving state employees a paid MLK holiday. That same year, the National Football League threatened to move Super Bowl XXVII, which was planned for Arizona in 1993, if the MLK holiday was voted down.

In the November 1990 election, Arizona voters were offered two King Day options: Proposition 301, which replaced Columbus Day on the list of paid state holidays, and Proposition 302, which merged Lincoln's and Washington's birthdays into one paid holiday to make room for MLK Day. Both measures failed to pass, with only 49% of voters approving Prop 302, the more popular of the two options; although some who voted "no" on 302 voted "yes" on Prop 301. Consequently, the state lost the chance to host Super Bowl XXVII, which was held at the Rose Bowl in Pasadena, California. In a 1992 referendum, the voters, this time given only one option for a paid King Day, approved state-level recognition of the holiday.

In May 2000, South Carolina governor Jim Hodges signed a bill to make King's birthday an official state holiday. South Carolina was the last state to recognize the day as a paid holiday for all state employees. Before the bill, employees could choose between celebrating Martin Luther King Jr. Day or one of three Confederate holidays.

== Presidential tradition ==
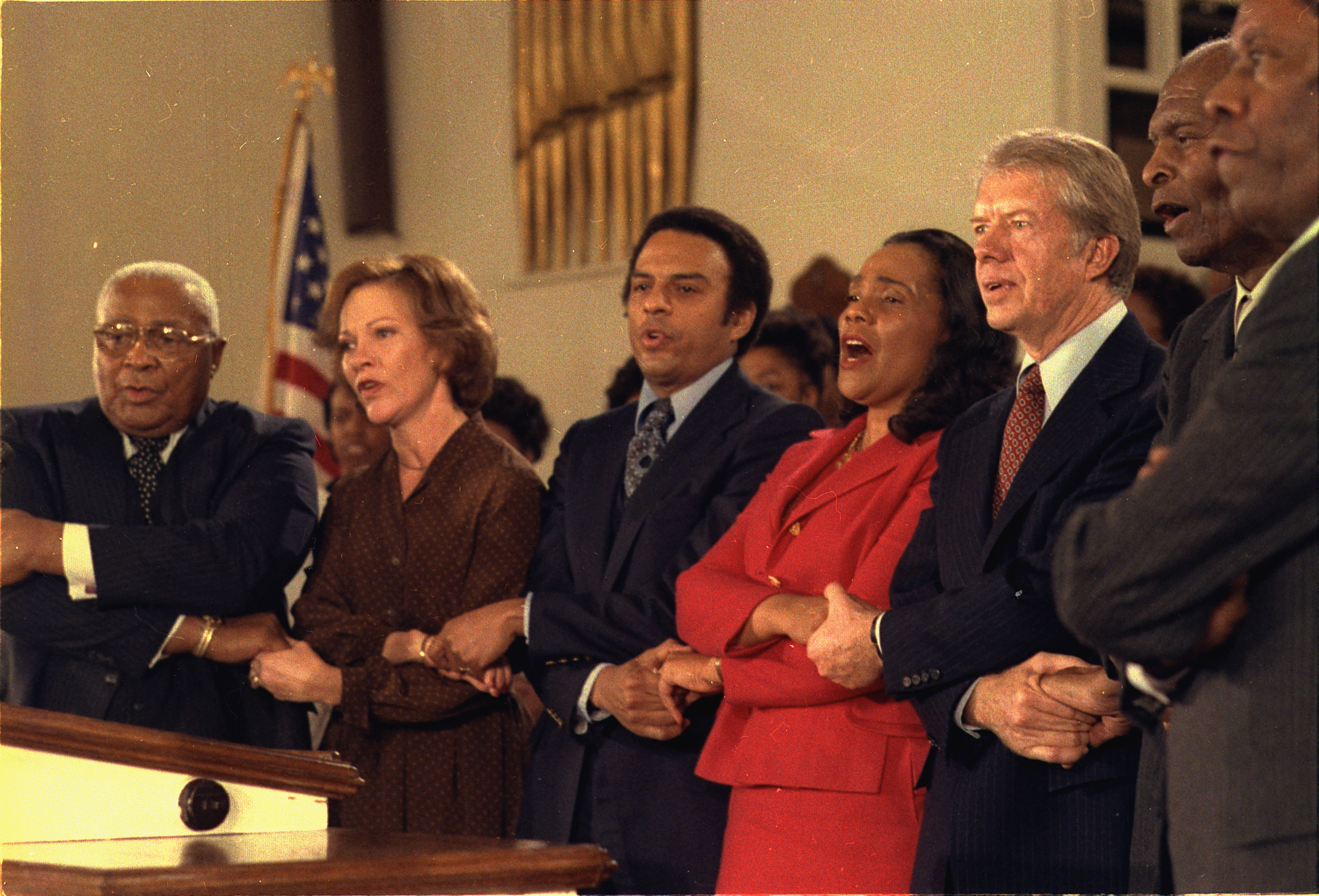
Martin Luther King Sr., Rosalynn Carter, Andrew Young, Coretta Scott King, and President Jimmy Carter in 1979.

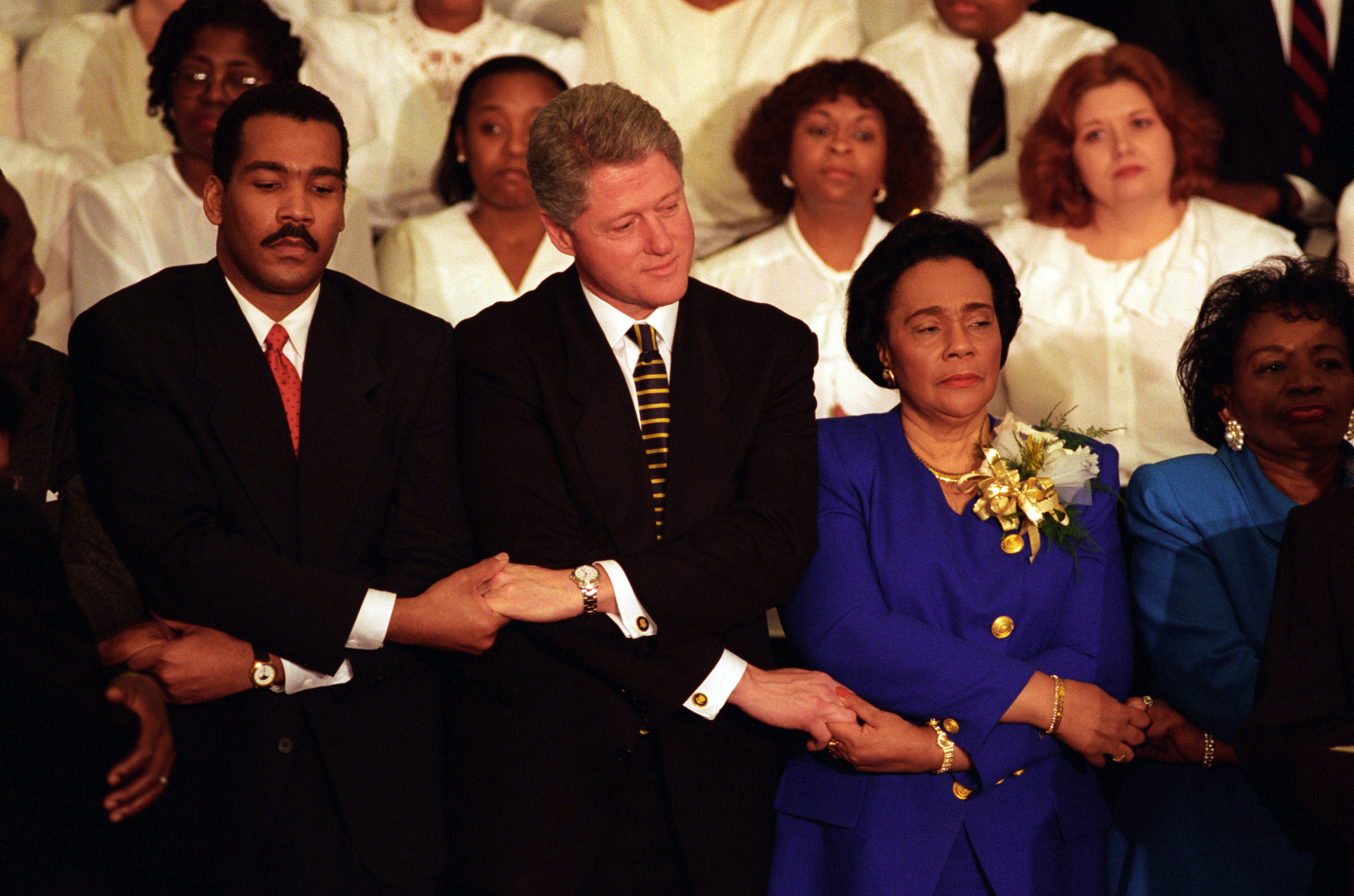
Dexter King, President Bill Clinton, and Coretta Scott King in 1996.

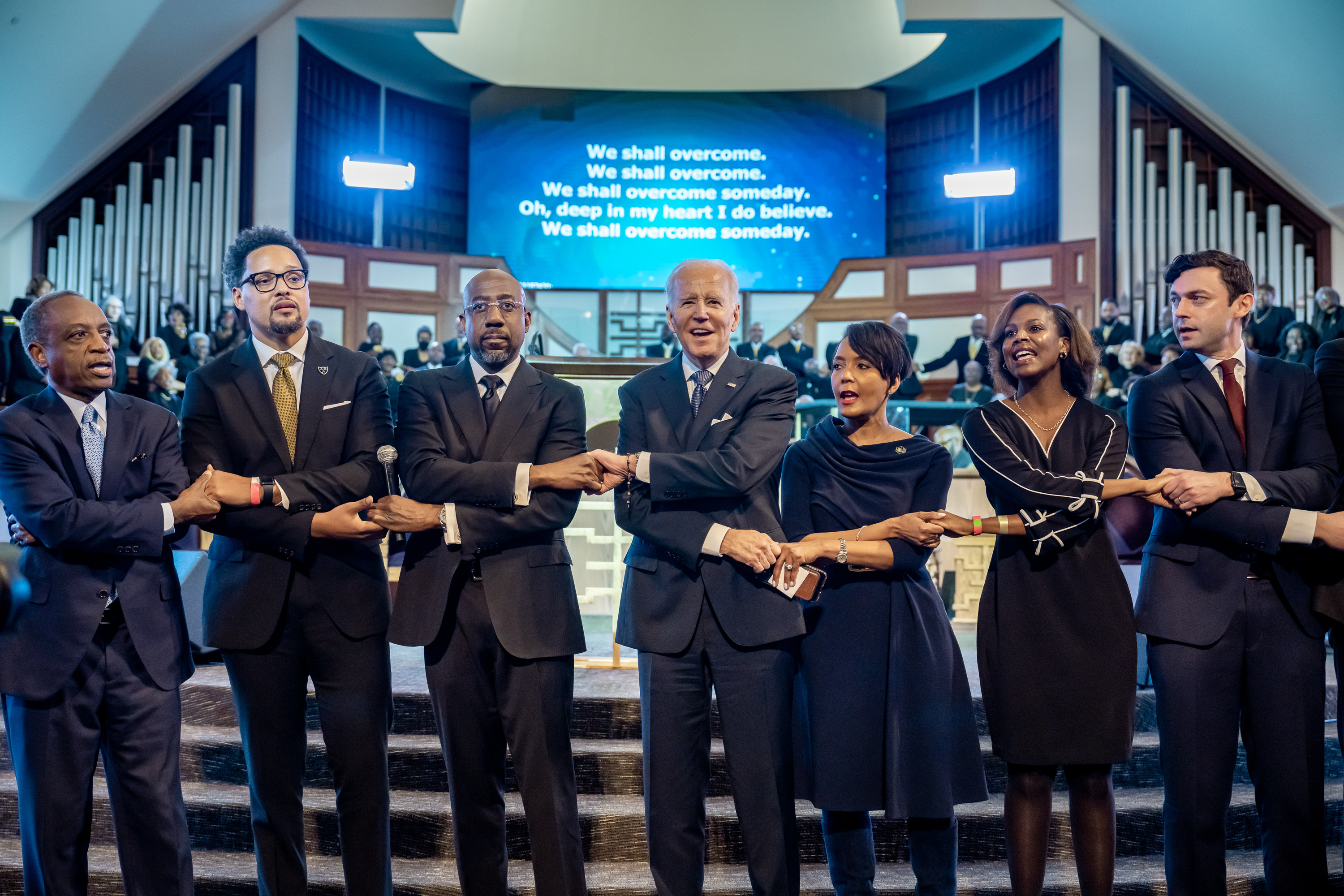
Raphael Warnock and President Joe Biden in 2023.

Many American presidents have come to commemorate this day at Ebenezer Baptist Church in Atlanta, where King served as assistant pastor for eight years.

== Alternative names ==
While all states now observe the holiday, some did not name the day after King. For example, in New Hampshire, the holiday was known as "Civil Rights Day" until 1999, when the State Legislature voted to change the name of the holiday to Martin Luther King Day.

Several additional states have chosen to combine commemorations of King's birthday with other observances:

- In Alabama: "Robert E. Lee/Martin Luther King Birthday".
- In Arizona: "Martin Luther King Jr./Civil Rights Day".
- In Arkansas: it was known as "Dr. Martin Luther King, Jr.'s Birthday and Robert E. Lee's Birthday" from 1985 to 2017. Legislation in March 2017 changed the name of the state holiday to "Dr. Martin Luther King, Jr.'s Birthday" and moved the commemoration of Lee to October.
- In Idaho: "Martin Luther King Jr.–Idaho Human Rights Day".
- In Mississippi: "Martin Luther King's and Robert E. Lee's Birthdays".
- In New Hampshire: "Martin Luther King Jr. Civil Rights Day".
- In Virginia: it was known as Lee–Jackson–King Day, combining King's birthday with the established Lee–Jackson Day. In 2000, Lee–Jackson Day was moved to the Friday before Martin Luther King Jr. Day, establishing Martin Luther King Jr. Day as a holiday in its own right. Lee-Jackson Day was eliminated in 2020.
- In Wyoming: it is known as "Martin Luther King Jr./Wyoming Equality Day". Liz Byrd, the first black woman in the Wyoming legislature, introduced a bill in 1991 for Wyoming to recognize MLK day as a paid state holiday; she compromised on the name because her peers would not pass it otherwise.

== Observance ==
=== Workplace leave ===
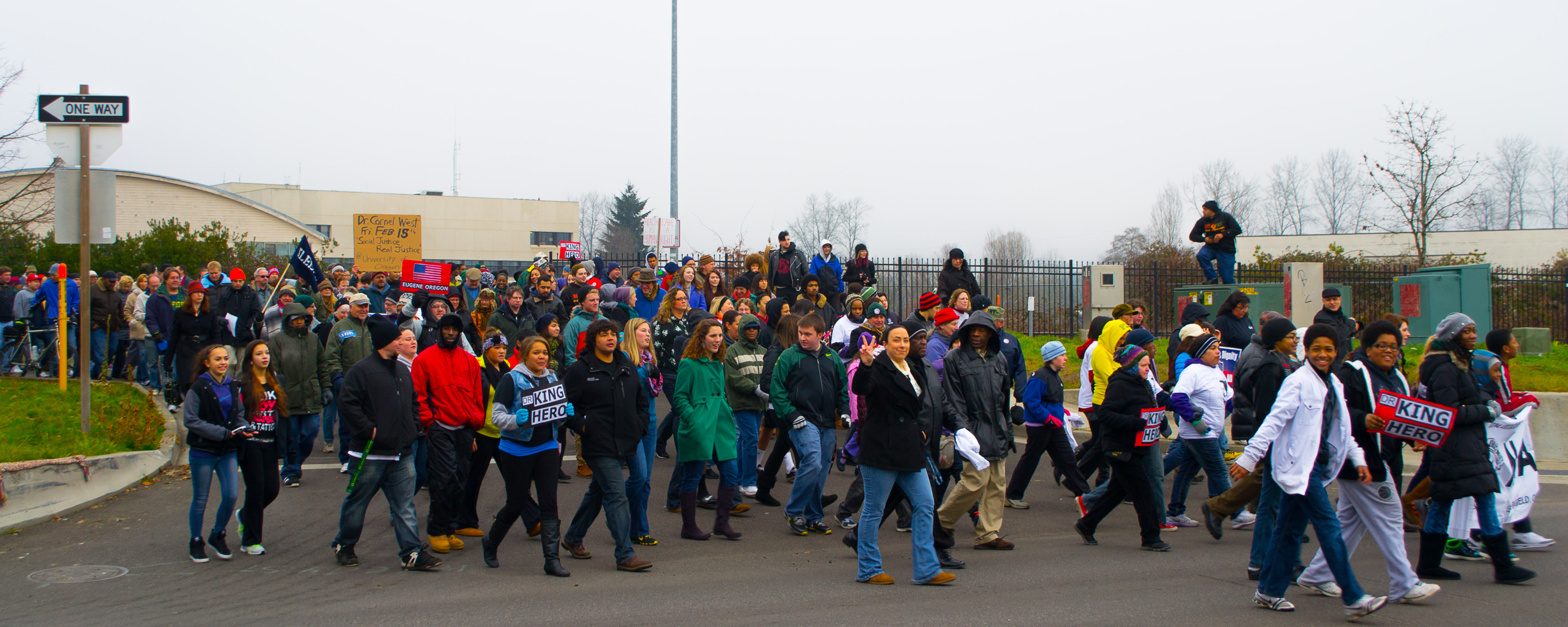
A march in Eugene, Oregon

In 2019, 45% of employers gave employees the day off. The reasons for not providing the day off have varied, ranging from the recent addition of the holiday to its occurrence just two weeks after the week between Christmas and New Year's Day, when many businesses are closed for part or all of it. The New York Stock Exchange and NASDAQ both close for trading, and banks are generally closed.

Many schools and places of higher education are closed for classes. Others remain open but may hold seminars or celebrations of King's message. The observance of MLK Day has led to some colleges and universities extending their Christmas break to include the day as part of the break. Some employers use MLK Day as a floating or movable holiday.

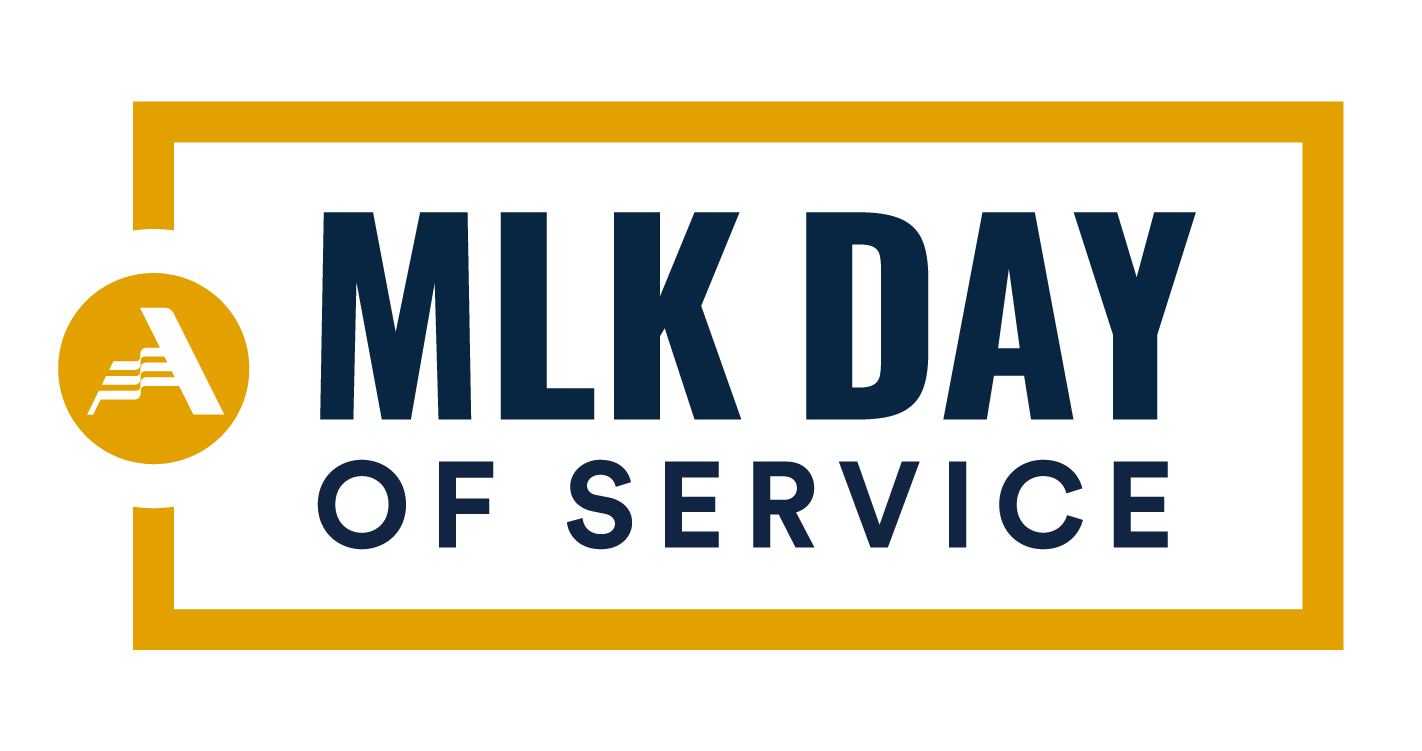

=== National Day of Service ===
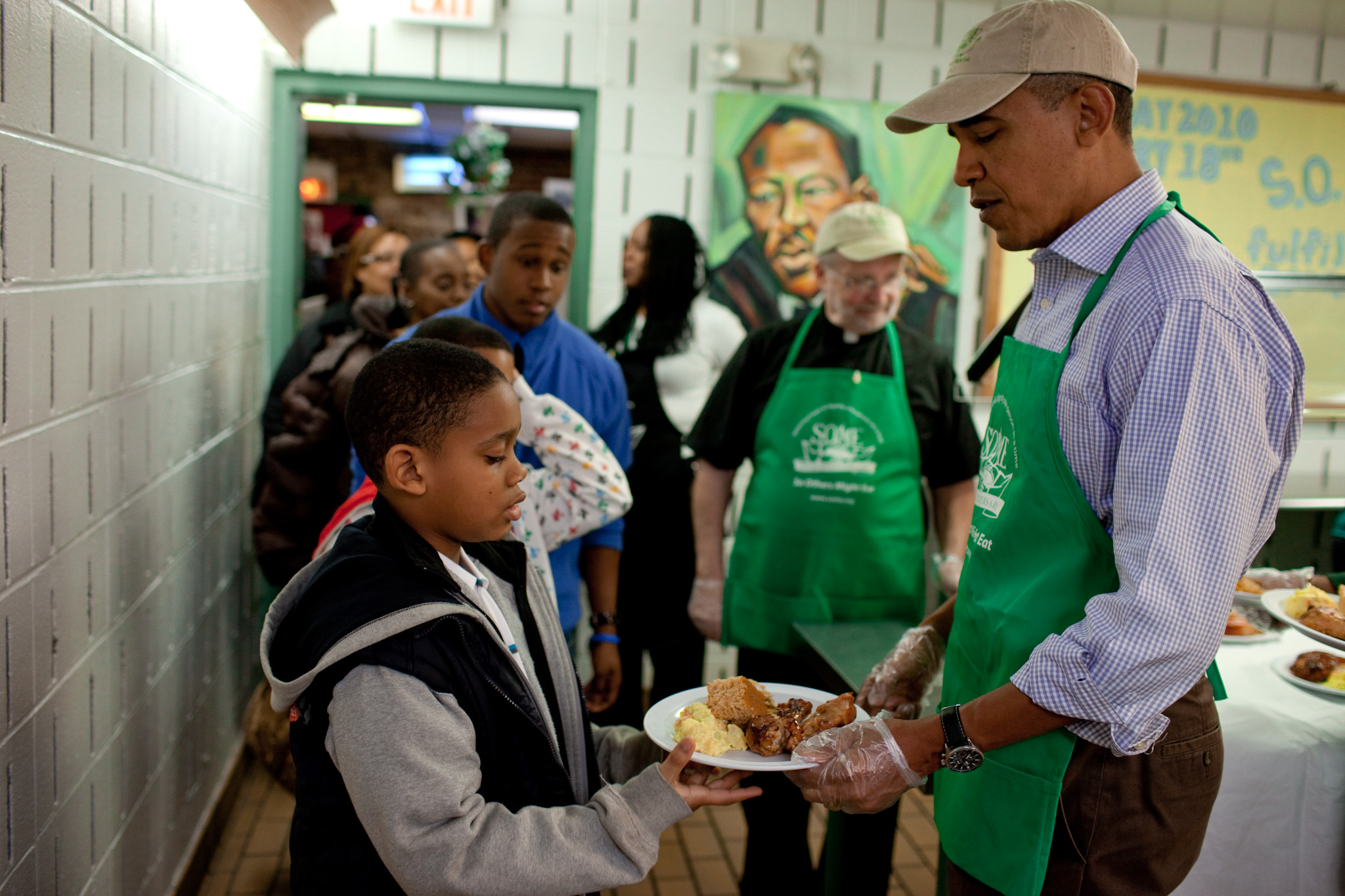
President Barack Obama serving lunch at a Washington soup kitchen on MLK Jr. Day, 2010

The national "Martin Luther King, Jr., National Day of Service" was started by former Pennsylvania U.S. Senator Harris Wofford and Atlanta Congressman John Lewis, who co-authored the King Holiday and Service Act. The federal legislation challenges Americans to transform the King Holiday into a day of citizen action volunteer service in honor of King. The federal legislation was signed into law by President Bill Clinton in August 1994. Since 1996, Wofford's former state office director, Todd Bernstein, has been directing the annual Greater Philadelphia King Day of Service, the largest event in the nation honoring King.

Since 1994, the day of service has been coordinated nationally by AmeriCorps, a federal agency, which provides grants to organizations that coordinate service activities on MLK Day.

The only other official national day of service in the U.S., as designated by the government, is September 11 National Day of Service (9/11 Day).

Previously, entry to national parks was free on MLK Day and Juneteenth; however, under a December 2025 directive by the Trump Administration, this was ended, and instead free entry would be granted on Donald Trump's birthday, which coincides with Flag Day.

=== Speeches ===
Cesar Chavez campaigned with him to call attention to the economic needs of farmworkers in the United States. Chavez used his speech on this day in 1990 to again call attention to the similarity between his campaign regarding pesticide issues and King's campaigns. He later was honored with the creation of Cesar Chavez Day in imitation of this holiday.

=== Canada ===
The day is not a holiday in Canada. It is commemorated annually by the City of Toronto and City of Ottawa governments in Ontario and Montreal in Quebec.

=== Israel ===
In 1984, during a visit by the U.S. Sixth Fleet, Navy chaplain Rabbi Arnold Resnicoff conducted the first Israeli presidential ceremony in commemoration of Martin Luther King Jr. Day, held in the President's Residence, Jerusalem. Aura Herzog, wife of Israel's then-President Chaim Herzog, noted that she was especially proud to host this special event, because Israel had a national forest in honor of King, and that Israel and King shared the idea of "dreams".

Resnicoff continued this theme in his remarks during the ceremony, quoting the verse from Genesis, spoken by the brothers of Joseph when they saw their brother approach, "Behold the dreamer comes; let us slay him and throw him into the pit, and see what becomes of his dreams." Resnicoff noted that, from time immemorial, there have been those who thought they could kill the dream by slaying the dreamer, but – as the example of King's life shows – such people are always wrong.

=== Japan ===
Martin Luther King Jr. Day is observed in the Japanese city of Hiroshima. In January 2005, Mayor Tadatoshi Akiba held a special banquet at the mayor's office as an act of unifying his city's call for peace with King's message of human rights.

=== Netherlands ===
Every year since 1987, the Dr. Martin Luther King Tribute and Dinner has been held in Wassenaar, The Netherlands. The Tribute includes young people and veterans of the Civil Rights Movement as well as music. It always ends with everyone holding hands in a circle and singing "We Shall Overcome". The Tribute is held on the last Sunday in January.

== Dates ==
1986–2103

Observed on the third Monday in January. Dates with a gray background indicate Martin Luther King Jr. Day falling on the same day as the Presidential Inauguration.

Date	Years																				
January 21		1991		2002	2008	2013	2019		2030	2036	2041	2047		2058	2064	2069	2075		2086	2092	2097
January 20	1986	1992	1997	2003		2014	2020	2025	2031		2042	2048	2053	2059		2070	2076	2081	2087		2098
January 19	1987		1998	2004	2009	2015		2026	2032	2037	2043		2054	2060	2065	2071		2082	2088	2093	2099
January 18	1988	1993	1999		2010	2016	2021	2027		2038	2044	2049	2055		2066	2072	2077	2083		2094	2100
January 17		1994	2000	2005	2011		2022	2028	2033	2039		2050	2056	2061	2067		2078	2084	2089	2095	2101
January 16	1989	1995		2006	2012	2017	2023		2034	2040	2045	2051		2062	2068	2073	2079		2090	2096	2102
January 15	1990	1996	2001	2007		2018	2024	2029	2035		2046	2052	2057	2063		2074	2080	2085	2091		2103

== See also ==
- Civil rights movement in popular culture
- List of African-American holidays

=== General holidays ===
- List of holidays by country
- List of holidays commemorating individuals
- List of multinational festivals and holidays
- Public holidays in the United States

=== Volunteer day events ===
- Education and Sharing Day
- Global Youth Service Day
- Good Deeds Day
- International Volunteer Day
- International Year of Volunteers
- Make a Difference Day
- Mitzvah Day
- National Philanthropy Day (U.S. and Canada)
- Random Acts of Kindness Day
- Sewa Day
- World Kindness Day
