= World Kindness Day =

International observance on 13 November

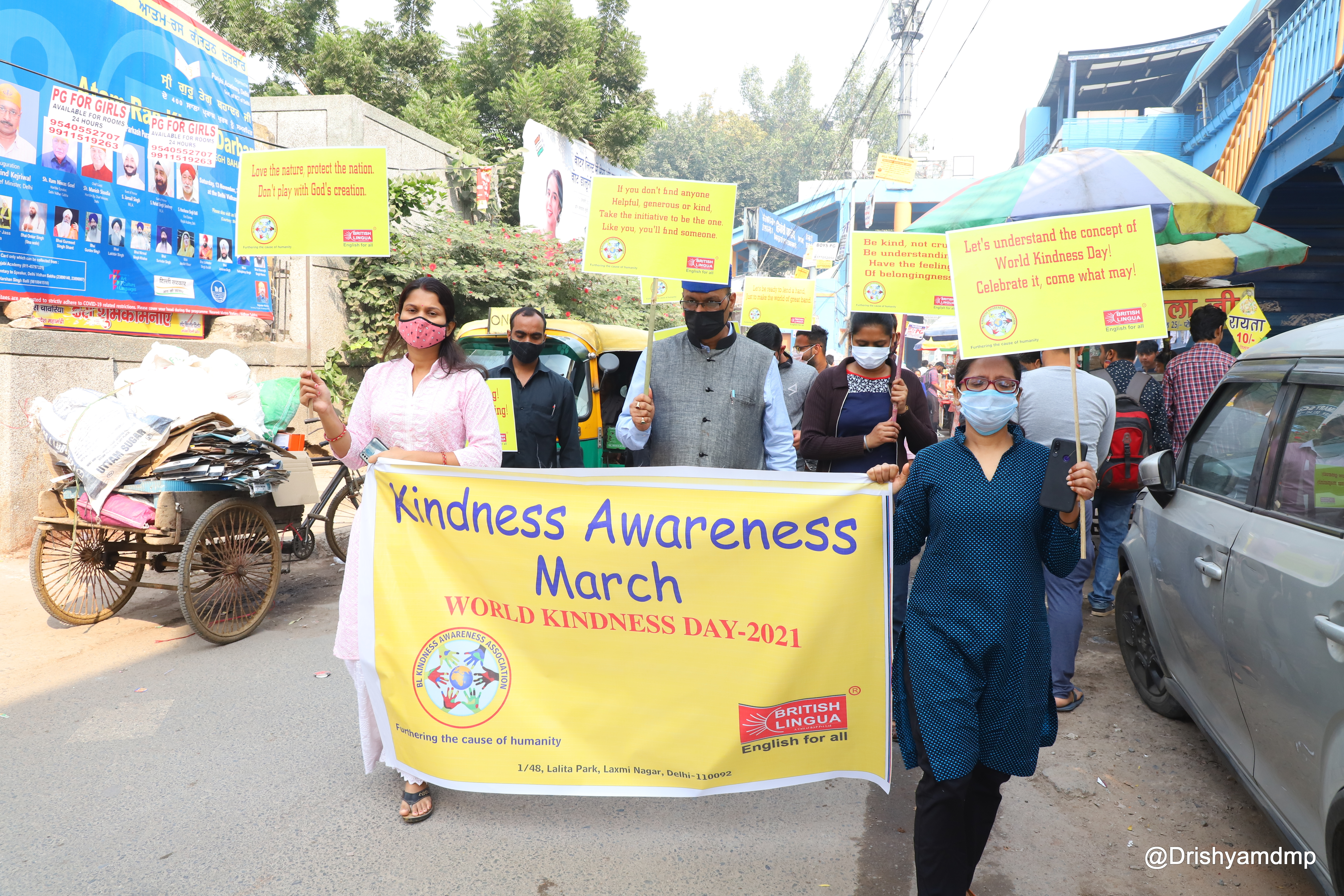
- Celebrations: every year
- Date: 13 November
- Next time: 13 November 2027
- Frequency: Annual
- First time: 13 November 1998

World Kindness Day is an international observance on 13 November. It was introduced in 1998 by the World Kindness Movement, a coalition of nations' kindness NGOs. It is observed in many countries, including Canada, Australia, Nigeria and the United Arab Emirates. Singapore observed the day for the first time in 2009. Italy and India also observed the day. In the UK, it is fronted by David Jamilly, who co-founded Kindness Day UK with Louise Burfitt-Dons.

== History ==
In 2010, at the request of Michael Lloyd-White, the New South Wales Federation Parents and Citizens Association wrote to the Minister of The NSW Department of Education to place World Kindness Day on the NSW School Calendar.

In 2012, at the request of the Chairman of World Kindness Australia, World Kindness Day was placed on the Federal School Calendar and then the Minister of School Education, Early Childhood, and Youth. The Hon Peter Garrett provided a Declaration of Support for World Kindness Australia and placed World Kindness Day on the National School Calendar for over 9000 schools.

Schools across the globe are now celebrating World Kindness Day and work with local NGOs such as the Be Kind People Project and Life Vest Inside In the USA. In 2012 in Australia, Marie Bashir, Governor of New South Wales, hosted an event for the first time at Government House to celebrate World Kindness Day and accepted a Cool To Be Kind Award from year 3 & 4 students. Australian Councils representing over 1.3 million residents have also signed Declarations of Support for World Kindness Australia placing World Kindness Day on the Council Calendar of Events.

Events include THE BIG HUG, handing out Kindness Cards, Global Flash mob, which was coordinated by Orly Wahba from the US and was held in 15 countries and 33 cities with its images of the event making the big screens in New York City. Canada celebrates with The Kindness Concert and in Singapore in 2009, 45,000 yellow flowers were given away. In 2017 World Kindness day was also celebrated in Slovenia, organized by volunteering organization Humanitarček as part of their project Randomized Kindness.

== Objective ==
World Kindness Day is to highlight good deeds in the community focusing on the positive power and the common thread of kindness for good which binds us. Kindness is a fundamental part of the human condition which bridges the divides of race, religion, politics, gender and location. Kindness Cards are also an ongoing activity which can either be passed on to recognize an act of kindness and or ask that an act of kindness be done. According to Gulf News, "it is a day that encourages individuals to overlook boundaries, race and religion."

== See also ==
- Pay it forward

=== General holidays ===
- List of holidays by country
- List of multinational festivals and holidays

=== Volunteer day events ===
- Global Youth Service Day
- Good Deeds Day
- International Volunteer Day
- International Year of Volunteers
- Mitzvah Day
- National Philanthropy Day (U.S. and Canada)
- Random Acts of Kindness Day
- Sewa Day
- Education and Sharing Day
- Make A Difference Day
- Martin Luther King Jr. Day
