= Shikun & Binui =

Israeli construction company

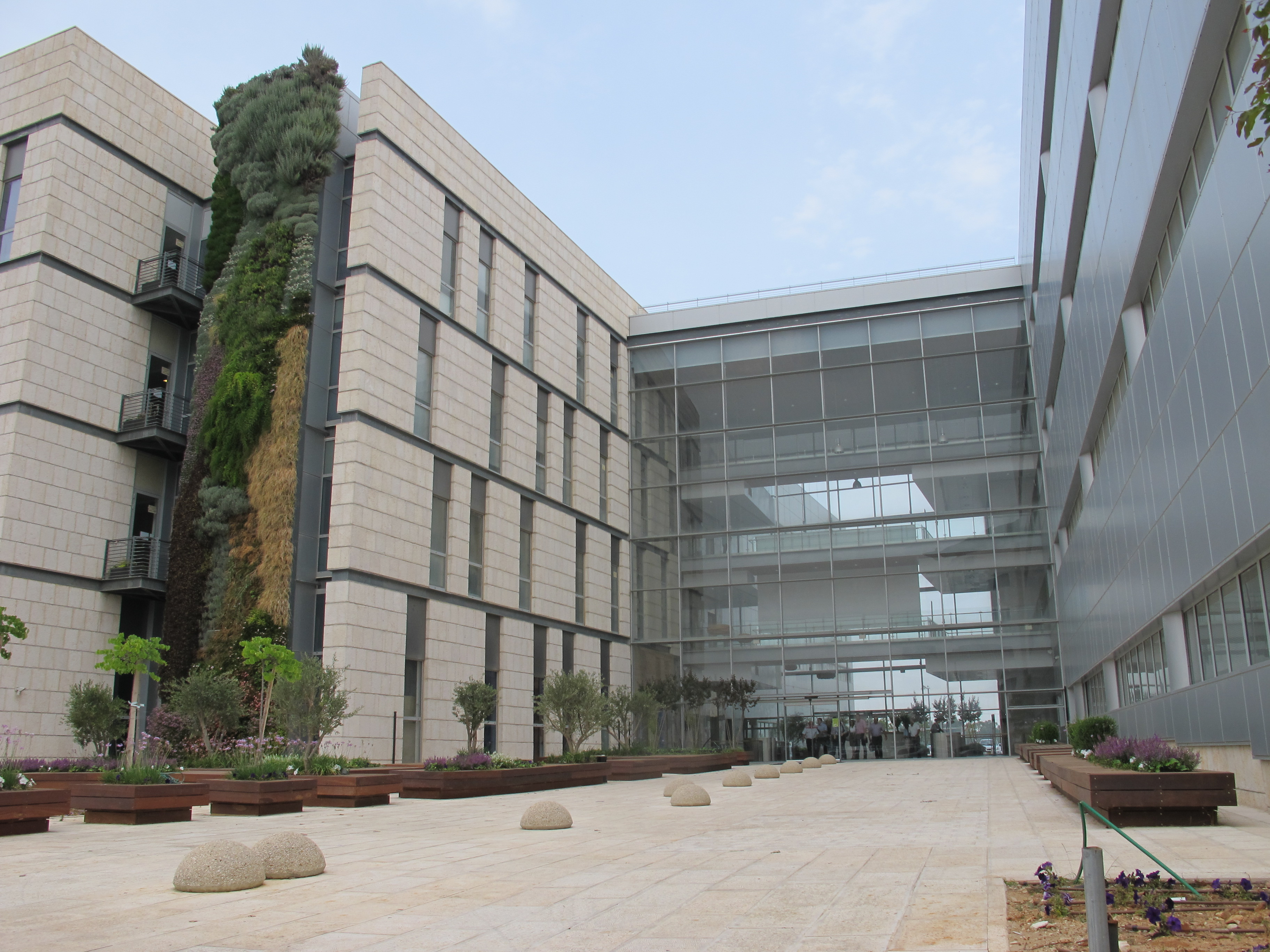
- Headquarters in Airport City
- Native name: Hebrew: שיכון ובינוי
- Type: Public
- Traded as: TASE: SKBN
- Industry: Building and infrastructure contracting; Real-estate development and facility management (residential, office, commercial and long-term lease); power and renewables; water and environment; concessions
- Founded: 1924; 102 years ago
- Founder: Histadrut - General Organization of Workers in Israel
- Headquarters: Airport City, Lod, Israel
- Key people: Amit Birman, CEO
- Revenue: ▲₪ 6.6 billion (2020)
- Operating income: ▲₪ 499 million (2020)
- Net income: ▲₪ 181 million (2020)
- Total equity: ▲₪ 3.3 billion (December 2020)
- Owners: Netanel H. Saidoff (controlling shareholder)

Shikun & Binui (Hebrew: שיכון ובינוי, lit. "Housing and Construction"; TASE: SKBN) is a global business group based in Israel which operates through subsidiaries in businesses such as infrastructure, real estate, energy and concessions. Shikun & Binui's subsidiaries operate in more than twenty countries.

== History ==
Shikun & Binui was established in 1924, during the Mandate for Palestine. It was owned by Solel Boneh the construction arm of the Jewish trade union Histadrut.

In 1924, Solel Boneh (which later became part of Shikun & Binui) was established by the General Organization of Workers in Israel (the Histadrut) with the aim of uniting the different groups of workers who paved and built infrastructure throughout Israel, resulting in the creation of the largest labor contractor in the country. In 1958, in line with Prime Minister of Israel Golda Meir vision, Solel Boneh expanded its operations into African countries, such as Nigeria, Uganda, Kenya, Ghana and others.

In 1996, the Histadrut's share in the company was sold to the company's employees and to Arison Investments (owned by the late Ted Arison, now owned by his daughter Shari Arison) as part of a large-scale privatization of the Histadrut's assets.

In 2007, the Shikun & Binui Group adopted sustainability as part of its corporate policy, a step that led to changes in the Group's structure, the daily conduct of its employees and increased involvement in projects that match the values of sustainability and ESG, such as renewables, water desalination and waste treatment.

In 2013, the Shikun & Binui Group won the Green Globe Award, which is given by “Life & Environment”, the umbrella organization of the green organizations in Israel, for a green business initiative.

In June 2018, Arison Investments sold its stake in the company (47%) to Netanel H. Saidoff, for NIS 1.1 billion. At this time, Tamir Cohen was appointed as the group's Chairman and CEO.

In December 2024, Amit Birman was appointed as the group's Chairman and CEO.

The Group's companies are involved in large-scale projects in Israel and around the world, in the fields of real-estate development and building contracting. The Group's experience and expertise, includes the planning, design, engineering, financing, permitting, construction, operation and maintenance of real-estate assets, as well as various infrastructure projects in the fields of power, renewables, transportation, water and wastewater treatment, environment and social infrastructure.

In 2012 the Ministry of Finance (Norway) announced that the Government Pension Fund of Norway would no longer invest in Shikun & Binui due to the company's breach of international law in East Jerusalem.

== Fields of operation ==
- Shikun & Binui Concessions - The concession division of Shikun & Binui specializes in the development and implementation of PPP - Public Private Partnership concession-type projects, in Israel and around the world, in various fields including transportation, water desalination, waste treatment, energy and social infrastructure. The group develops and implements global B.O.T - Build-Operate-Transfer projects, including in Israel: Cross-Israel Highways “Road 6” toll road; Carmel Tunnels toll lanes; Hadera seawater desalination plant; the Cundinamarca Eastern Perimeter Corridor highway in Colombia and others.
- Shikun & Binui SBI Infrastructures - The international infrastructure division of Shikun & Binui operates as a leading EPC Contractor worldwide: in West Africa - Nigeria, Ivory Coast, Ghana, Republic of Benin; in East Africa - Uganda, Kenya, Tanzania and Mozambique; in Latin America – Guatemala and Colombia.
- Shikun & Binui Solel Boneh - the construction division of Shikun & Binui in Israel. Solel Boneh is one of the leading companies in Israel in the field of building contracting, infrastructure and earthworks and building materials. The company has been involved in many important national projects over the years. The company's customers in Israel include government ministries, governmental companies and municipalities, as well as private developers.
- Shikun & Binui Real Estate - Shikun & Binui's real estate development division in Israel was established in 1933, under the name "Shikun Ovdim". The company has been involved in the development of numerous projects in Israel. The company is also involved in the development and marketing of large-scale clusters for office, commercial, or leisure complexes, taking into account global trends in recycling, energy efficiency, and the green environment.
- Shikun & Binui Europe - The international real estate division of Shikun & Binui currently operates in five countries: the Czech Republic, Hungary, Romania, Poland and Serbia, and is engaged in the fields of real estate development: residential, office and commercial centers.
- Shikun & Binui Energy - The energy division of the Shikun & Binui Group, develops, builds, operates and maintains power plants for electricity generation based on solar energy (thermo-solar and photovoltaic) and on conventional energy (natural gas), in Israel, the United States, Romania and Italy.
- Shikun & Binui USA (S&B USA) has been active in the U.S. since 2012 and is now operating out of Pittsburgh, PA through its infrastructure development and equity subsidiary, Shikun & Binui USA Concessions and its construction subsidiary, Shikun & Binui USA Construction. S&B USA develops and builds complex infrastructure projects and specializes in Public-Private Partnership (P3) and Design-Build projects, in which the developer and contractor are responsible for the management of mega projects, including aspects of financing, designing, permitting, maintaining and operating.

== Main subsidiaries ==
- Shikun Ovdim
- Solel Boneh Building & Infrastructure
- Solel Boneh International
- Blue-Green
- Lime & Stone Production
- Shikun & Binui – Renewable Energy

== Notable projects ==
- Ashalim Power Station
- Highway 6 (Israel)
- Carmel Tunnels

== See also ==
- Economy of Israel
