= Mitzvah Day International =

Annual day of faith-based social action

- Genre: Day of faith-based social action
- Date: November
- Frequency: Annual
- Location: United Kingdom
- Inaugurated: 2005
- Founder: Laura Marks
- Participants: 40,000

Mitzvah Day International is an annual day of faith-based social action that takes place in November each year, primarily in the United Kingdom. On Mitzvah Day each year, community groups and individuals undertake a range of volunteer projects for those in need in their local community. Organizations register with Mitzvah Day, which in turn helps match volunteers with local projects. The objective is to encourage people to give their time, rather than their money, to worthwhile local causes, whilst also creating deeper linkages within communities and supporting charities. In 2013, close to 30,000 people participated in Mitzvah Day around the world. Though based within the UK's Jewish Community, Mitzvah Day traditionally marks the first day of UK National Inter Faith Week, and as a result has expanded to include participants from other faith communities as well. 'Mitzvah' is the Hebrew biblical term for 'deed' or 'commandment', which has come to mean 'good deed' or 'charitable act' in contemporary English.

The 2020 date was Sunday November 15.

== History ==
Mitzvah Day International was founded by Laura Marks in 2005, who, upon returning to her native UK from a period spent in Los Angeles, decided to bring the 'Mitzvah Day' concept she became familiar with through the Temple Israel of Hollywood synagogue back to the UK. Though the Mitzvah Day she was familiar with (and most Mitzvah Days in the US) was based around a single community or congregation, her concept for Mitzvah Day in the UK was to unite Jewish community and other groups around a single coordinated day of social action across the country. Mitzvah Day was originally associated with the Jewish Community Centre for London, and became registered as an independent charity in the United Kingdom in 2008.

== Endorsements ==
Mitzvah Day has been publicly endorsed by many public figures in the United Kingdom, including former UK Prime Minister David Cameron, Deputy Prime Minister and Leader of the Liberal Democrats Nick Clegg, Leader of the Labour Party Ed Miliband Former UK Prime Minister Tony Blair, UK Prime Minister Boris Johnson, Chief Rabbi of the United Kingdom Jonathan Sacks, and The Archbishop of Canterbury. It won a Prime Minister's Big Society Award in 2011

== International expansion ==
Headquartered in London, UK, the event has since spread to include participation from many international partners, primarily in Europe, North America, Israel, Australia, Brazil, and Southern Africa. In 2012, the name of the organization officially changed from 'Mitzvah Day' to 'Mitzvah Day International' to reflect the growing participation of community groups outside the UK.

== See also ==
- Mitzvah
- Big Society
- Civic Engagement
- Community Service
- Volunteerism
- Interfaith dialogue
- Global Youth Service Day
- International Council of Voluntary Agencies
- International Volunteer Day
- International Year of Volunteers
- Join Hands Day
- Make A Difference Day
- Mandela Day
- MLK Day of service
- National Philanthropy Day (USA and Canada)
- National Public Lands Day (USA)
- National Volunteer Week
- Random Acts of Kindness Day
- September 11 National Day of Service (9/11 Day)
- Sewa Day
- World Kindness Day
