= Ted Arison =

Israeli businessman

- תד אריסון
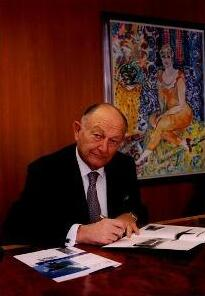
- Born: Theodore Arison; 24 February 1924; Mandatory Palestine
- Died: 1 October 1999 (aged 75); Tel Aviv, Israel
- Education: American University of Beirut
- Occupations: Businessman; Military officer; sports team owner
- Known for: Founder Carnival Cruise Lines and Norwegian Caribbean Line; Former owner of Miami Heat
- Spouses: Mina Wasserman (m. 1948; div. 1966) Marilyn "Lin" Hersh (m. 1967)
- Children: 3, Including Micky and Shari
- Military career
- Allegiance: Israel
- Service years: 1948 - 1950 (IDF); British Army (1942-1945)
- Rank: Sgan Aluf (Lieutenant Colonel); Sergeant Major (1940-1945)

Ted Arison (Hebrew: תד אריסון;24 February 1924 – 1 October 1999) was an Israeli businessman who co-founded Norwegian Cruise Lines in 1966 with Knut Kloster and soon left to form Carnival Cruise Lines in 1972. He is the founding owner of the Miami Heat of the National Basketball Association (NBA).

== Early years ==
Arison was born Theodore Arisohn on 24 February 1924 in Tel Aviv (in the then British Mandate of Palestine) to Meir, a wealthy businessman, and Vera Arisohn. He was a third-generation sabra of Romanian Jewish descent. Arison attended high school at the Herzliya Hebrew Gymnasium and studied commerce and economics at the American University of Beirut. During World War II, he enlisted in the British Army and fought in Italy as a soldier in the Jewish Brigade. After the British departure, he served as an officer in the Israel Defense Forces during the 1948 Arab–Israeli War, eventually achieving the rank of lieutenant colonel. From 1946 to 1951, he managed M. Dizengoff & Co., a shipping company.

== Career ==
Frustrated by the lack of business opportunities, Arison wrapped up his business and moved to the United States in 1952. He took his family to New York in 1952 and moved to Miami, Florida, in 1966, where he co-founded Norwegian Cruise Lines in 1966 with Knut Kloster. In 1971 the partnership broke up on bad terms and Arison formed Carnival Cruise Lines in 1972 with the help of Meshulam Riklis.

In 1981, he established the National Foundation for Advancement in the Arts based in Miami. He brought professional basketball to South Florida with the formation of the Miami Heat in 1988, and established the Arison Foundation, a philanthropic institution, in Israel and the United States.

In 1986, Arison's condominium neighbor, Count de S.G. Elkaim (Vice President at E.F. Hutton & Company, Inc.), advised him to go public before an impending big correction in the stock market. Following his advice and guidance, Carnival Cruise Lines was floated on the American Stock Exchange in July 1987, one month before the stock market top and the infamous crash of October 1987.

Arison was a member of the Non-Group, a civically influential group of Miami business elites.

In February 1989, Arison awarded in the strictest of confidence the exclusive sale of the company at $30 per share to Elkaim. The stock market recovery from the emotional shock on the 1987 crash was not able to absorb this transaction. Consequently, having Carnival in the stock market and the ensuing rally until 1999 catapulted Arison to become one of the world's richest people.

== Return to Israel ==
In an effort to avoid estate tax in the United States, in 1990, Arison renounced his U.S. citizenship and residence and returned to Israel, where he founded Arison Investments. In 1997, Arison Investments headed a consortium that purchased the controlling share in Bank Hapoalim for more than $1 billion, the largest privatization in Israel's history.

== Family ==
Arison married Mina Wasserman (1927–2012), who immigrated to Israel from Romania, in 1948 and they had two children: a son Micky (born 1949) and a daughter Shari (born 1957). The couple divorced after moving to Florida in 1966. In 1967 he married Marilyn "Lin" Hersh and later adopted her son Michael (born 1961).

== Death ==
Arison died in Tel Aviv on 1 October 1999. Micky Arison was chief executive officer of Carnival Corporation & plc until August 2013 and is currently chairman of the company. Shari Arison is Israel's wealthiest woman, and is the owner of Arison Investments that comprises several business companies, the largest among them Bank Hapoalim, and of several philanthropic organizations that are subsidiaries of The Ted Arison Family Foundation.

At the time of his death, Arison failed by approximately nine months to meet the requirement of being outside of United States territory for 10 years for the tax benefits of his renunciation of U.S. citizenship to be realized.

== See also ==
- Arison family

== Sources ==
- "Ted Arison, world's wealthiest Jew, dies in Tel Aviv". JewishSF.com. 8 October 1999.

Sporting positions
New creation	Miami Heat principal owner 1988–1995	Succeeded by Micky Arison
