= Random Acts of Kindness Day =

Day to celebrate kindness

Random Acts of Kindness Day on February 17
- Date: November 4, February 17
- Frequency: annual

Random Acts of Kindness Day is a day to celebrate and encourage random acts of kindness. "It's just a day to celebrate kindness and the whole pay it forward mentality", said Tracy Van Kalsbeek, executive director of the Stratford Perth Community Foundation, in 2016, where the day is celebrated on November 4. It is celebrated on September 1 in New Zealand and on February 17 in the US.

== Background ==
The Random Acts of Kindness Foundation (RAK) was founded in 1995 in the US. It is a nonprofit headquartered in Denver, Colorado. The founder of the group is Will Glennon. Glennon is currently the Chairman of World Kindness, USA.

Random Acts of Kindness (RAK) day began in 2004 in New Zealand. Promoters of the day suggest paying for another person's meal in drive-thrus, letting someone go ahead in line, buying extra at the grocery store and donating it to a food pantry, buying flowers for someone, helping someone change a flat tire, posting anonymous sticky notes with validating or uplifting messages around for people to find, complimenting a colleague on their work, and other acts.
