= America's Promise =

Foundation in the United States

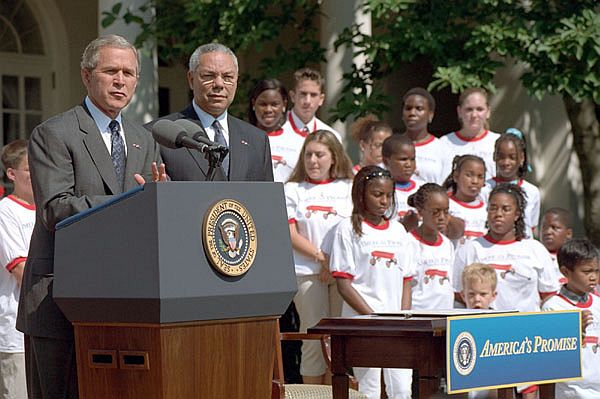
President George W. Bush and Secretary of State Colin Powell hold a press conference about America's Promise

America's Promise Alliance is an American alliance of nonprofit, community organizations, businesses, and government organizations dedicated to improving the lives of young people.

The organization was founded on the idea that children and youth need "Five Promises" to thrive—caring adults, safe spaces, a healthy start, effective education, and the opportunity to serve—but that not nearly enough young people have access to these basic resources.

America's Promise works to raise awareness about the importance of these resources and inspire actions that help more children and youth receive them. The organization does this by leading national public awareness campaigns, conducting research, hosting events and convening summits, and partnering with hundreds of national, state, and community organizations that work directly with youth.

America’s Promise is currently led by CEO Mike O'Brien, having been founded and formerly chaired by retired Gen. Colin L. Powell and subsequently his wife, Alma Powell. O'Brien previously spent 17 years as the CEO of iMentor, a college success organization, and currently has roles in Blue Engine, BUILD, and NationSwell in addition to America's Promise.

== History ==
The Presidents' Summit for America's Future in 1997 – a national summit held in Philadelphia to promote a civic response to many of the country's problems, particularly the challenges facing at-risk youth – led to the creation of America's Promise Alliance.

Presidents Bill Clinton and George H. W. Bush convened the summit, and Gen. Colin L. Powell, USA (Ret) served as the event's general chairman. Focusing specifically on helping the nation's young people, Gen. Powell agreed to lead a three-year campaign called America's Promise – The Alliance for Youth, which set out to improve the lives of 2 million of the nation's 15 million at-risk youth by 2000.

In 2000, the target end-date of the campaign, General Powell determined that America's Promise should continue its work and continue to operate as a nonprofit organization. Ending the work now, he said, would be "kind of like saying we'll be out of Bosnia in a year."

Early in its history, America's Promise drew criticism for not being able to prove it had achieved its goals. A later analysis from the National 4-H Council, the nation's largest youth development organization, agreed that while the organization's impact was difficult to document, “much of the increased focus on youth and positive youth development … can be attributed to the visibility, energy, and funding America's Promise brought to youth work.”

In the years since, the work of America’s Promise has grown to encompass awareness building (see GradNation campaign below), academic research (see Center for Promise), cross-sector collaboration (see Alliance partners), and events that bring people together (see GradNation campaign).

=== Presidents' Summit for America's Future ===
In July 1995, former Michigan Governor George Romney (and father of 2012 Republican presidential candidate Mitt Romney) outlined his vision of "a summit at which all living presidents and leaders from all sectors of society would gather to support citizen service and show it was not a partisan issue." Only four days after completing this outline, Romney died of natural causes.

Before his death, however, Romney shared his vision of this bipartisan summit focused on volunteerism with former U.S. Senator Harris Wofford, who had recently become CEO of the Corporation for National and Community Service and Bob Goodwin, president of Bush's Points of Light Foundation. Wofford and Goodwin agreed to enlist their organizations in fulfilling Romney's plans for the summit, so Romney "died knowing that the summit would go forward."

In his 1997 State of the Union address, President Bill Clinton laid out the overarching theme and goal of the summit: "to mobilize America's citizen power in a united effort to solve our common problems, especially those that threaten our young people." Three months later, Presidents Clinton and George H. W. Bush officially co-convened the Presidents' Summit for America's Future in Philadelphia. Retired Gen. Colin Powell served as the chairman of the event, and four out of the five living presidents attended, with Nancy Reagan representing her husband Ronald Reagan.

More than 20 governors, nearly 100 mayors, 145 community delegations, and many prominent business leaders and celebrities also attended the summit. With the official slogan, "Two Million by 2000," the summit encouraged business, government, nonprofit, and community leaders across the country to work together to improve the lives of 2 million of the nation's 15 million at-risk youth by 2000.

In 1998, Gen. Powell responded to criticism that the summit and ensuing America's Promise campaign were little more than symbolic gestures and reported that, as a result of the summit, among other things, Big Brothers and Big Sisters amassed a 22 percent increase in adults enlisting as mentors; Boys and Girls Clubs of America added 100,000 new members; the U.S Chamber of Commerce committed to helping 3 million young people find summer jobs; and the LensCrafters company gave 100,000 free eye exams to children from low-income families.

== Notable leaders ==
Gen. Colin L. Powell, USA (Ret) served as the founding chair of America’s Promise and remained board chair until 2001, when he stepped down to become U.S. Secretary of State. Former governor of Montana Marc Racicot took over as chair, followed by former U.S. Senator Harris Wofford in 2002. Starting in 1998, Robert M. Devlin served as a board member for over ten years.

Alma Powell, a respected audiologist and General Powell’s wife, became chair in 2004 and served until her death in 2024. She published two children’s books in 2003, America’s Promise and My Little Wagon.

In 2004, America’s Promise – The Alliance for Youth changed its name to America’s Promise Alliance to place a greater emphasis on the strength of Alliance partners (see Alliance partners). "We see ourselves as a convener, a catalyst for action, and we help our partners and communities that focus on the measurable goals," said then-CEO Marguerite Kondracke.

Kondracke retired as president and CEO in 2012 and was replaced by John S. Gomperts, whose “association with America’s Promise began when he served as chief of staff to Harris Wofford, the CEO of the Corporation for National & Community Service and one of the key conveners of the Summit for America’s Future.” Gomperts stepped down from the CEO role in 2020, being replaced by current CEO Mike O'Brien.

The board of directors includes notable members such as Miami Foundation President Javier Soto, former Teach For America and College Board strategist Steve Colón, Vice President of the Carnegie Corporation LaVerne Evans Srinivasan, and NCTA – The Internet and Television Association President, and General and Mrs. Powell’s son, Michael K. Powell. For a full list of board members, visit the America’s Promise Alliance website.

The America’s Promise board of directors also includes three full voting youth members. Youth members must be between the ages of 18 and 24 and agree to serve two-year terms, operating as "a critical and necessary component to [the America’s Promise] leadership teams," according to Mrs. Powell.

== The Five Promises ==
The Presidents' Summit for America's Future, the 1997 event that launched America's Promise Alliance, included a Summit Declaration signed by Presidents Clinton, GHW Bush, Carter, Ford, and Nancy Reagan on behalf of her husband.

The Summit Declaration pledged to fulfill the "promise of America" for every child, which remains the core objective of America's Promise. Specifically, the declaration outlined five essential resources the presidents agreed all children need to develop into successful adults, referred to as the Five Promises, which form the basis of America's Promise efforts and initiatives. President Gerald Ford, General Colin Powell, Mrs. Nancy Reagan, and Vice President Al Gore

The Five Promises are: caring adults to guide and encourage them; safe places, both physical and psychological, in which students can safely develop; a healthy start in the form of proper nutrition and exercise; effective education that prepares them for work and life; and opportunities to help others and foster a sense of community, self-respect and service.

In July 2001, President George W. Bush added his signature, and President Barack Obama signed the declaration in September 2014.

== Alliance partners ==
One of the greatest strengths of America's Promise Alliance, one organizational analysis noted, is its ability to coordinate the national response to youth development by collaborating with its many partners, who "provide the arms and legs with which to carry out the Five Promises."

America's Promise counts nearly 400 national partners in its multi-sector alliance. Corporate partners include Target Corporation and State Farm; foundation partners include Usher's New Look Foundation and the Ford Foundation; nonprofit partners include Boys & Girls Clubs of America, the YMCA, and Big Brothers Big Sisters of America; education partners include the Council of Chief State School Officers (CCSSO), ASCD, and the Education Commission of the States; faith-based partners include Catholic Charities USA and Faith Leaders for Community Change.

America's Promise Alliance has the full list of its partners available on its website.

== GradNation Campaign ==
In 2006, two America's Promise Alliance partner organizations, Civic Enterprises and the Bill and Melinda Gates Foundation, released the study, The Silent Epidemic: Perspectives of High School Dropouts. The report revealed that nearly one third of public high school students were failing to graduate high school with their class. The research also explored the reasons why so many students were dropping out of school and drew national attention to the "silent epidemic" of high school dropouts.

Spurred by the urgency to end this dropout crisis, America's Promise launched the Dropout Prevention campaign in 2008, later named the GradNation campaign, and hosted 105 Dropout Prevention Summits in all 50 states from April 2008 until 2010. The summits worked to increase awareness about the dropout crisis, encourage collaboration between different sectors and organizations, and facilitate action in states and communities to improve their graduation rates.

Overall, more than 33,000 educators, business leaders, nonprofit leaders, policymakers, families, and youth attended these summits. An analysis from Duke University found that these summits helped raise public awareness about the high school dropout crisis and inspired the creation of new programs and collaborative efforts.

In early 2009, America's Promise Alliance commissioned Grad Nation: A Guidebook to Help Communities Tackle the Dropout Crisis, written by Robert Balfanz and Joanna Hornig Fox of the Everyone Graduates Center at Johns Hopkins University and John M. Bridgeland and Mary McNaught from Civic Enterprises, to provide communities with research and best practices to raise graduation rates at the local level.

In 2010, America's Promise partnered with the Alliance for Excellent Education, Civic Enterprises, and the Everyone Graduates Center at Johns Hopkins University to set the GradNation campaign goal of achieving a 90 percent on-time national high school graduation rate and increasing postsecondary enrollment by 2020. President Obama joined U.S. Secretary of Education Arne Duncan and General and Mrs. Powell for the announcement at the U.S. Chamber of Commerce.

State Farm was a lead sponsor of the campaign, which also pledged to focus on reducing the country's number of "dropout factories," or schools where "less than 60 percent of students who started as freshmen remain enrolled four years later."

For the past few years, researchers, governors, and President Obama have drawn attention to the steady increase in the national on-time high school graduation rate.

"Just 10 years ago, the nation's on-time high school graduation rate was hovering around 70 percent, where it had been stuck for decades," former CEO John S. Gomperts wrote in Education Week in 2016.

In October 2016, President Obama announced that the on-time high school graduation rate had again reached a record high for the fifth year in a row, this time at 83.2 percent.

"The greatest credit goes to students, families and teachers who are putting in the work and showing great determination and resolve, sometimes in the face of great challenge," Gomperts wrote in September 2016.

=== Building a Grad Nation ===
In 2010, the campaign's leading organizations worked together to release the Building a Grad Nation report, research that analyzes the progress and challenges of raising the national high school graduation rate.

U.S. Secretary of Education Arne Duncan spoke at the launch of the report, calling it "required reading for those who believe that the high school dropout problem is too intractable to successfully take on." The four organizations – America's Promise Alliance, the Alliance for Excellent Education, Civic Enterprises, and the Everyone Graduates Center – have released the report every year since 2010.

In 2013, America's Promise committed to helping community partners across the nation convene 100 GradNation Community Summits over three years. Modeled after the Dropout Prevention Summits, the community summits were designed to inspire local collaboration and action to raise high school graduation rates.

Summits have been hosted in major cities like Chicago, Boston, and Philadelphia, as well as smaller cities and rural areas in North Carolina, Northwest Indiana, and Tennessee.

In 2015, America's Promise launched the GradNation State Activation initiative, an effort to increase high school graduation rates at the state level. The three-year initiative provides funding to state organizations that encourage statewide innovation and collaboration, shares that knowledge, and develops successful models all states can replicate. Organizations in Arizona, Massachusetts, and Minnesota were each awarded with $200,000 grants.

== The Center for Promise ==
In 2012, America's Promise partnered with Tufts University School of Arts and Sciences to open the Center for Promise, an applied research institute studying what helps "create the conditions so that all young people in America have the opportunity to succeed in school and life."

In 2014, the Center produced the report, Don't Call Them Dropouts: Understanding the Experiences of Young People Who Leave High School Before Graduation, which drew national attention to the challenging life and socioeconomic factors that cause many students to drop out of high school. Similar to the Silent Epidemic study, Don't Call Them Dropouts focused heavily on youth perspective and analysis.

"Rather than merely boredom or lack of motivation, young people who drop out are likely growing up in ‘toxic environments' with unstable families, violent neighborhoods, and unsafe schools," an Education Week article said of the report. "Some students are caregivers for parents, siblings, or their own children. Others are homeless or the victims of abuse."

In 2015, the Center for Promise moved from Tufts University to the Boston University School of Education. That same fall, the Center produced a follow-up study to Don't Call Them Dropouts that examined the role that relationships with adults play in keeping students in school called Don't Quit On Me: What Young People Who Left School Say About the Power of Relationships.

The Center's 2016 study, Who's Minding the Neighborhood? The Role of Adult Capacity in Keeping Young People on a Path to Graduation examined how adult-to-youth ratios in neighborhoods impact educational outcomes, the first study to do so. Adding seven adults to a neighborhood, researchers concluded, results in one fewer student dropping out of high school.

Also released in 2016: Barriers to Wellness: Voices and Views from Young People in Five Cities, a youth-led assessment that provides insight into the obstacles to wellness young people of color face in five cities.

== Other initiatives ==
=== The Youth Opportunity Fund ===
In 2015, America’s Promise partnered with the Citi Foundation to launch the Youth Opportunity Fund, a $3 million initiative to support programs that prepare urban youth for the workforce. It awarded $250,00 grants to each of 12 organizations in 10 U.S. cities: Boston, Chicago, Dallas, Los Angeles, Miami, New York City, Newark, St. Louis, San Francisco and Washington, D.C.

The program announced a second round of funding in 2016, providing an additional $3 million for 12 more organizations in the same cities, or a total of $6 million to support 24 organizations—including Communities In Schools, Year Up, Café Momentum, and Per Scholas—and reach more than 7,000 youth.

=== Promise of America Awards ===
America’s Promise recognizes people making extraordinary contributions to the lives of children and youth with the “Promise of America” award, the highest honor conferred by America's Promise. Past recipients include U.S. Senator Lamar Alexander, Magic Johnson Enterprises CEO and founder and NBA star Magic Johnson, and Corporation for Public Broadcasting President and CEO Patricia de Stacey Harrison.

== See also ==
- Association for Leaders in Volunteer Engagement
- Association for Volunteer Administration
- Global Youth Service Day
- Good Deeds Day
- International Volunteer Day
- International Year of Volunteers
- Join Hands Day
- Make A Difference Day
- Mandela Day
- MLK Day of service
- Mitzvah Day
- Points of Light Foundation
- Random Acts of Kindness Day
- Sewa Day
- World Kindness Day
