= Hands on Network =

HandsOn Network
- Type: Private, Non-Profit
- Founded: 1992
- Headquarters: Atlanta, Georgia

The HandsOn Network was a non-profit organization focusing on community service based in Atlanta, Georgia, U.S.A. It sought to bring people together to strengthen communities through meaningful volunteer action, and mobilized some half million volunteers in communities inside and outside the United States. HandsOn Network created and managed nearly 50,000 projects a year, from building wheelchair ramps in San Francisco to teaching reading in Atlanta, to rebuilding homes and lives in Gulf Coast communities following Hurricane Katrina. Originally an independent organization, it became part of the nonprofit organization. The nonprofit was disbanded sometime in 2019.

== History ==
The organization was founded 1992 under the name City Cares. They sought an alternate way of doing volunteering, in contrast to established organizations such as the Points of Light Foundation and its associated Voluntary Action Centers. In particular, they sought to focus on attracting younger, more business-focused volunteers by offering a single day of service on a per-month basis. The national entity would then be an umbrella organization and which would provide shared resources to local entities.

Example local affiliates included New York Cares, which in point of fact was launched in 1987 and provided the basis for the later national model.

In 2004, City Cares renamed itself to the HandsOn Network.

Over time, HandsOn Network became made up of 58 national and international volunteer organizations that act as entrepreneurial civic action centers. HandsOn Network worked in partnership with local organizations and schools to create HandsOn service projects that produce tangible benefits in communities. The Network enlisted a corps of hundreds of thousands of volunteers who join forces to address community needs worldwide.

HandsOn Network collaborated with hundreds of major companies and organizations to promote volunteerism across the United States. They include the CMT television station and SAP investments, as well as several with nonprofit organizations and volunteer groups. Additional corporate sponsors of HandsOn Network included Home Depot, Outback Steakhouse, Cisco Systems, Ameriquest, The Coca-Cola Company, Corporation for National and Community Service, W.K. Kellog Foundation, UnitedHealth Group, Case Foundation, Singing for Change, and others.

In August 2007, HandsOn Network merged with the Points of Light Foundation to form the Points of Light Institute, the nation's largest network of organizations skilled at mobilizing volunteers to meet important needs in local communities. and its website redirected to www.pointsoflight.org/handsonnetwork during much of 2019. Its original website, handsonnetwork.org, no longer works and the Points of Light Foundation page about the network was taken down by the Fall of 2019.

The individual volunteer centers under the HandsOn Network, such as HandsOn Atlanta, HandsOn Suburban Chicago, HandsOn Twin Cities (Minnesota), HandsOn San Francisco and HandsOn PDX (for the Portland, Oregon Metro area) remain.

== See also ==
- Association for Volunteer Administration
- European Volunteer Centre (CEV)
- Global Youth Service Day
- Good Deeds Day
- International Association for Volunteer Effort (IAVE)
- International Council of Voluntary Agencies (ICVA)
- International Volunteer Day
- International Year of Volunteers
- Join Hands Day
- Make A Difference Day
- Mandela Day
- MLK Day of service
- Mitzvah Day
- Random Acts of Kindness Day
- Sewa Day
- World Kindness Day
