= United Nations Volunteers =

Intergovernmental organization (1970-)

- Abbreviation: UNV
- Formation: 7 December 1970; 55 years ago
- Legal status: Active
- Headquarters: Bonn, Germany
- Head: Executive Coordinator of United Nations Volunteers; Toily Kurbanov
- Parent organization: United Nations Development Programme
- Website: www.unv.org

The United Nations Volunteers (UNV) programme is a United Nations organization that contributes to peace and development through volunteerism worldwide.

Volunteerism is a powerful means of engaging people in tackling development challenges, and it can transform the pace and nature of development. Volunteerism benefits both society at large and the individual volunteer by strengthening trust, solidarity and reciprocity among citizens, and by purposefully creating opportunities for participation.

UNV contributes to peace and development through a dual mandate: mobilizing UN Volunteers for the United Nations and advocating for recognition of volunteers as a way to achieve the Sustainable Development Goals (SDGs). UNV embraces volunteerism as universal and inclusive, and recognizes volunteerism in its diversity as well as the values that sustain it: free will, commitment, engagement and solidarity. In 2023 UNV deployed almost 13,000 UN Volunteers to over 56 UN partners in all regions of the world.

Based in Bonn, Germany, UNV is active in around 130 countries every year. UNV, with six regional offices and field units in many countries, is administered by the United Nations Development Programme (UNDP) and reports to the UNDP Executive Board.

== History ==
In 1962, the US Peace Corps convened the International Conference on Middle Level Manpower in Puerto Rico, where the role of international volunteers helping to build skills in developing countries was promoted. As a result, the International Peace Corps Secretariat, later the International Secretariat for Volunteer Service (ISVS), was created as a global organization to promote volunteer services for development around the world. A United Nations Volunteers initiative was proposed in a speech at Harvard University on June 13, 1968, by Shah Mohammad Reza Pahlavi and UNV was established 1970 by the UN General Assembly. ISVS became instrumental in the establishment of UNV and was itself dissolved in 1976.

UNV was originally headquartered in Geneva, Switzerland. In 1996, the headquarters moved to Bonn, Germany, specifically to Haus Carstanjen. UNV headquarters moved to the former offices of the German Parliament in 2007.

Executive Coordinators of UNV, their nationalities and their time in the role:

(Russia) Toily Kurbanov, 1 January 2021 to present
Olivier Adam (France), 2 January 2017 to 31 December 2020
Richard Dictus (Netherlands), 2 January 2013 through most of 2016
Flavia Pansieri (Italy) February 2008 through most of 2012
Ad de Raad (Netherlands), November 2003 (a.i), permanent in August 2004 through most of 2007
Sharon Capeling-Alakija (Canada), 1 January 1998 - November 2003 (her death)
(United States) Brenda Gael McSweeney (USA), 1988 - 1997
Edward White, (a.i) exact dates unknown
Hikmat Nabulsi (Syria), appointed 1977, exact dates unknown
John Gordon (Canada), appointed 1974, exact dates unknown
Assad K. Sadry (Iran), 1970 (first Coordinator of UNV)

== UN Volunteers ==
UNV directly mobilizes on average 10,000 people as UN Volunteers every year nationally and internationally, with 80 per cent coming from Global South, and, as of 2023, 64 per cent volunteering within their own countries. UN Volunteers receive a Volunteer Living Allowance (VLA), a financial allowance intended to cover basic living expenses each month. The minimum age for UN Volunteers is 18 years. There is no upper age limit. UN Volunteers help to organize and run local and national elections and support a large number of peacekeeping and humanitarian projects. UN Volunteers comprise one third of all international civilians working in UN peacekeeping operations.

With the UNV programme, individuals can volunteer in their own country (national volunteers), in a country different from their country of origin (international volunteers), or through the Internet (online volunteers).

== Online Volunteering ==
In addition, UNV operates the Online Volunteering Service, a web-based virtual volunteering platform for non-governmental organizations (NGOs) or other civil society organizations, governments or other public institutions, United Nations agencies or other intergovernmental institution to involve online volunteers in various projects. The service was launched in 2000 as a part of NetAid, which hosted and co-managed the service until 2005. The service operates in English, French and Spanish.

In 2022, over 8,000 people volunteers with the Online Volunteering service attracted applications from numerous qualified volunteers.

Online volunteers mobilized through the Online Volunteering service are volunteers for the organization with which they collaborate. Online Volunteers do not follow the same conditions of service than UN Volunteers e.g. they do not receive a contract from UNV as such, and do not receive a VLA.

== Plan of Action to Integrate Volunteering into the 2030 Agenda ==
Since 2012, integrating volunteerism into discussions around the post-2015 development agenda has been a priority for UNV. In 2014, UNV focused on supporting the second round of UNDG dialogues on implementation of the post-2015 development agenda. The dialogues were framed around six themes: localizing the post-2015 development agenda, helping to strengthen capacities and build effective institutions, participatory monitoring for accountability, partnerships with civil society, engaging with the private sector, and culture and development. UNV co-led the dialogues on partnerships with civil society and was strongly engaged in the dialogues on participatory monitoring for accountability. Field Units and Post-2015 International UN Youth Volunteers supported all six dialogues in several countries, contributing to and conducting local, national and global events and workshops to ensure stakeholders' voices were heard, good practices shared and concrete opportunities identified.

To achieve the Sustainable Development Goals (SDGs), people's engagement in planning, implementation and monitoring needs to be facilitated and new partnerships forged. Volunteers will be instrumental in this process. This has strongly emerged from an extensive consultation process led by the UN, which has involved over 8 million people, and was summarized as follows by the UN Secretary-General in his Synthesis Report on the post-2015 sustainable development agenda:

As we seek to build capacities and to help the new agenda to take root, volunteerism can be another powerful and cross-cutting means of implementation. Volunteerism can help to expand and mobilize constituencies, and to engage people in national planning and implementation for the Sustainable Development Goals. And volunteer groups can help to localize the new agenda by providing new spaces of interaction between governments and people for concrete and scalable actions.

At the seventieth session of the UN General Assembly, the Secretary-General presented a proposed Plan of Action for the next decade and beyond (2016–2030). This plan aims at integrating volunteering in peace and development policies and programmes through a strategic and collective long-term approach that matches the period of SDG implementation.

The Plan of Action to Integrate Volunteering into the 2030 Agenda is a framework under the auspices of the United Nations through which Governments, United Nations entities, volunteer-involving organizations, private sector, civil society including academia and other stakeholders come together to integrate volunteerism into the planning and implementation of the 2030 Agenda for Sustainable Development and the Sustainable Development Goals (SDGs) by: a) strengthening people's ownership of the development agenda; b) integrating volunteerism into national and global implementation strategies; and c) measuring volunteerism.

A global technical meeting on volunteering will take place virtually in 2020 as a special event on the margins of the 2020 High-level Political Forum (HLPF) in New York. A UN General Assembly resolution defines the meeting theme "Reimagining volunteering for the 2030 Agenda" and requests that the United Nations Volunteers (UNV) programme organize it jointly with the International Federation of Red Cross and Red Crescent Societies (IFRC). The meeting will provide a platform to advance the debate on volunteering and identify how volunteering can accelerate the achievement of the Sustainable Development Goals (SDGs).

== Advocacy for recognition of volunteers ==
In 2012 UNV launched the Volunteer Action Counts campaign to tell the world about the impact of volunteering by documenting the actions of volunteers across the globe. Over 64 million actions were counted by the time the Rio+20 summit took place — a "remarkable testament to bottom-up, grassroots commitment" yet one more demonstration of how Rio+20 is mobilizing a global movement for change, as the UN Secretary-General, Ban Ki-moon, said to the United Nations General Assembly in 2012. The Volunteer Action Counts website and social media profiles continue to gather stories about volunteering and provide information about upcoming events, opportunities and best practices. Likewise, through the Online Volunteering service newsletter, UNV showcases experiences, best practices and lessons learned about volunteering via the Internet from organizations and volunteers worldwide.

UNV celebrates International Volunteer Day on 5 December every year.

== State of the World's Volunteerism Report ==
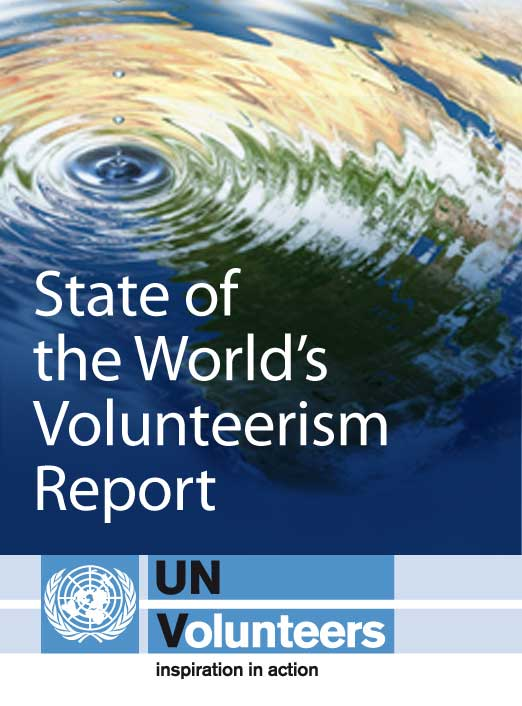
2011 State of the World's Volunteerism Report

Every three years UNV produces the State of the World's Volunteerism Report, a flagship UN publication designed to strengthen understanding on volunteerism and demonstrate its universality, scope and reach in the twenty-first century.

The first State of the World's Volunteerism Report by UNV programme was launched at the United Nations General Assembly in New York, United States, on 5 December 2011 and about 80 countries around the world. The report examined important contributions in diverse fields such as sustainable livelihoods, social inclusion, social cohesion and disaster risk reduction. By suggesting how volunteerism can be taken forward, the SWVR also provides an alternative vision of a better society.

The second State of the World's Volunteerism Report, Transforming Governance, was launched in June 2015. It is a "review of the power of volunteer voices to help improve the way people are governed. Drawing on evidence from countries as diverse as Brazil, Kenya, Lebanon and Bangladesh, the UN report shows how ordinary people are volunteering their time, energies and skills to improve the way they are governed and engaged at local, national and global levels. Better governance at every level is a pre-requisite for the success of the new set of targets for future international development, the Sustainable Development Goals".

The 2018 State of the World's Volunteerism Report, The thread that binds: Volunteerism and community resilience, was launched on 18 July 2018 during the 2018 High Level Political Forum in New York, United States. The report presents new evidence on the role of volunteerism in strengthening community resilience. It finds that communities value volunteerism because it enables them to create collective strategies for dealing with diverse economic, social and environmental challenges. At the same time, unless appropriately supported by wider actors, volunteering can be exclusive and burdensome for some groups. The report thus explores how governments and development actors can best engage with volunteerism to nurture its most beneficial characteristics, while militating against potential harm to the most vulnerable. In doing so, the report provides an important contribution to the evidence base on inclusive, citizen-led approaches to resilience-building.

The 2022 State of the World's Volunteerism Report, Building Equal and Inclusive Societies, was launched in December 2021. The report finds that volunteerism can foster collaborative relationships and decision-making, bring more power equality between citizens and state authorities, and allow for different types of civic participation.

== See also ==
- Association for Leaders in Volunteer Engagement
- Association for Volunteer Administration
- CUSO
- EU Aid Volunteers
- European Volunteer Centre (CEV)
- European Voluntary Service
- Federal Volunteers Service
- Fredskorpset
- International Association for Volunteer Effort (IAVE)
- International Council for Voluntary Agencies (ICVA)
- International Voluntary Service (IVS)
- International Year of Volunteers Plus 10
- Peace Corps
- Voluntary Service Overseas
- Voluntary social year
- Youth for Technology
