= Susan J. Ellis =

Author and consultant (b. 1948, d. 2019)

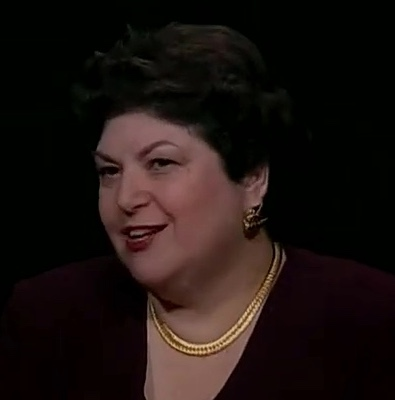
Ellis on CUNY TV's The Urban Agenda, 2000

Susan J. Ellis (March 18, 1948 – February 24, 2019) was an American trainer, presenter, researcher and consultant regarding volunteerism. She founded the largest publisher of volunteer-related books, Energize, Inc., which has published more than 25 books and provided consultancy and training services for organizations worldwide that involve volunteers, including the Everyone Ready Online Volunteer Management Training Program. She wrote or co-wrote 14 books, wrote more than 100 articles for various publications and is cited in more than 150 articles and books re: volunteerism. She was frequently called on by national media outlets for commentary regarding volunteerism and was quoted in stories in The New York Times, Fortune Magazine, the Chronicle of Philanthropy and many others. She is considered a pioneer regarding the promotion of the management of volunteers as a profession. She was based in Philadelphia.

== Career ==
Ellis graduated from Temple University in Philadelphia in 1969 with a Bachelor of Arts degree in English. She received a master's degree in folklore and folklife in 1971 from the University of Pennsylvania, producing a thesis on the history of scrapple.

She was the former director of special services at Philadelphia Family Court, where she managed volunteers, many of them assisting youth in the court system.

From 1981 to 1987 she was editor-in-chief of The Journal of Volunteer Administration (JoVA), a publication by the Association for Volunteer Administration (AVA). She wrote the column “On Volunteers” in The NonProfit Times from 1990 to 2015. She also wrote for other publications, including The Chronicle of Philanthropy.

She founded Energize, Inc. in 1977 and in the 42 years afterward assisted nonprofits, non-governmental organizations, charities, universities and associations throughout the world to create or strengthen their volunteer engagement and support for volunteers. The company also sold hundreds of books related to volunteer engagement, not only those published by the company. Energize clients included the Corporation for National Service, Court Appointed Special Advocates (CASA), the American Lung Association, the Boys and Girls Club of America, March of Dimes, 4-H and various United Way affiliates.

== Works and honors ==
Ellis is the author or co-author of fourteen books, several of which have been translated into Japanese, Taiwanese, French, and Italian. Since 2005, her best selling book is From the Top Down: The Executive Role in Successful Volunteer Involvement, 3rd Edition, which has sold more than 6000 copies in print and e-book. She gave speeches regarding recruiting and supporting volunteers in more than 26 countries.

Ellis co-authored, with Katherine H. Campbell, By the People: A History of Americans as Volunteers, New Century Edition, originally published in 1978 (when the co-author was called Katherine H. Noyes), and published in a third, updated version in 2005. She became a proponent of virtual volunteering in 1996 and was an advisor for the Virtual Volunteering Project, the first effort to document and promote online volunteering efforts. She is a co-author with Jayne Cravens of The Last Virtual Volunteering Guidebook: Fully Integrating Online Service into Volunteer Involvement, published in 2014.

She was frequently cited in various national and international publications regarding volunteerism-related topics, such as

- a 1995 article in The Baltimore Sun regarding funding and accounting for the Points of Light Foundation,
- an article in The New York Times raising questions and criticisms about America's Promise, a national charity led by Colin Powell,
- a CNN Money / Fortune Magazine article in 2000 about millions of retiring baby boomers having different, disruptive expectations about volunteering than previous generations,
- a 2009 article in The New York Times about the launch of Mandela Day
- a 2013 article in the Pittsburgh Tribune-Review about the gaps in service being left by older people who were retiring from volunteering
- a 2017 article in The Chronicle of Philanthropy about the surge in volunteering numbers after the 2016 Presidential election and
- a 2018 article about a decline in volunteering among young people in Education Week.

Ellis received the Harriet Naylor Distinguished Member Service Award from the Association for Volunteer Administration (AVA) in 1989.

She was a passionate fan of the original Star Trek television series and once taught a community college course in the Romulan language derived from a program by science-fiction author Diane Duane. Her company name was derived from the phrase "Energize" frequently said on the show.

== See also ==
- Sharon Capeling-Alakija
- International Year of Volunteers
- Presidents' Summit for America's Future
- National Volunteer Week
- Association for Research on Nonprofit Organizations and Voluntary Action (ARNOVA)
- Association of Leaders in Volunteer Engagement (ALIVE)
- Community engagement
- Human resources
- Human resource management
