= Sharon Capeling-Alakija =

Sharon Capeling-Alakija, O.C. (1944–2003) was a Canadian development administrator. She was born and grew up in Moose Jaw, Saskatchewan, where she completed her elementary, secondary and tertiary education, graduating in 1966 with a B.Ed. from the University of Saskatchewan. In the early 1960s, she taught history in Saskatoon, leaving Canada In the late 60s and early 70s to teach in Tanzania and Barbados. She became involved with NGOs and enhanced their effectiveness, in particular playing a central role in CUSO (Canadian University Service Overseas).

== Works ==
Between 1989 and 1994 she was Director of UNIFEM and developed initiatives for UNIFEM in favour of the international women's movement to assist women at policy and grassroots levels. While at UNIFEM, she established the Noel Foundation Life Award, whose recipients included the late Mother Teresa, Corazon Aquino and Cheng Yen.

From 1994 to 1997, she was Director of Evaluation and Strategic Planning at the United Nations Development Programme (UNDP).

From 1997 until her death in 2003, she was Executive Coordinator of United Nations Volunteers, spearheading the highly successful International Year of Volunteers in 2001 and the move of the Online Volunteering Service from NetAid. She also oversaw the buildup of UNV's largest single presence to date, in East Timor, during its transition towards independence; some 3,000 UN Volunteers from more than 100 countries supported the East Timor Public Administration, including electoral processes.

== Recognitions ==
In 1998 she was awarded an honorary doctoral degree from the University of Saskatchewan, and in 2003 was appointed an Officer of the Order of Canada.

At a memorial ceremony in December 2003 in New York City, UN Secretary-General Kofi Annan said,

At a time of unprecedented change in the world and in the role of the United Nations, Sharon had an instinctive grasp of the need for the Organization to reach out as widely as possible and engage people from all walks of life to join in our mission. She brought that understanding to bear on all her work with us -- whether as Executive Coordinator of the United Nations Volunteers programme, Director of Evaluation and Strategic Planning at UNDP, or Director of the UN Development Fund for Women. The highly successful International Year of Volunteers she led in 2001 provided vivid testimony of the energy and enthusiasm she brought to that approach... From the day Sharon set out into the world as a young volunteer, to her final contribution as head of UNV, this courageous woman never stopped quilting in the name of solidarity, for the benefit of all in one world... And I personally, shall miss hearing her call out “Uncle Kofi”. Now that she is gone, which other white-haired woman is going to call me Uncle Kofi?

== See also ==
- Susan J. Ellis
- Association for Research on Nonprofit Organizations and Voluntary Action (ARNOVA)
- Association of Leaders in Volunteer Engagement (ALIVE)
- Community engagement
- European Volunteer Centre (CEV)
- Human resources
- Human resource management
- International Association for Volunteer Effort (IAVE)
- International Council of Voluntary Agencies (ICVA)
