= National Center for Voluntary Action =

The National Center for Voluntary Action was an independent, private, non-profit organization that existed in the 1970s, and then extended on in merged forms, that sought to encourage volunteerism on the part of American citizens and organizations, assist in program development for voluntary efforts, and sought to make voluntary action an important force in American society.

The organization had its origins in 1969, the first year of the Nixon administration, when the Cabinet Committee on Voluntary Action was put into place. Led by United States Secretary of Housing and Urban Development George W. Romney, a study performed by this committee found a need for a national, non-governmental organization.

Hence came the National Center for Voluntary Action, created in 1970 by executive order of the president. At its first meeting on February 20, 1970, Romney stressed the value of voluntary action as the "fourth way" of solving problems (along with the federal government, state and local government, and private industry). In April 1970, Henry Ford II became the organization's first chair and Bud Wilkinson its first president.

Logo of the Voluntary Action Centers created by the National Center for Voluntary Action

The organization launched a nationwide effort to develop Voluntary Action Centers (previously known as Volunteer Bureaus) as local volunteer centers to help people meet their needs through actions of volunteers. A heart-shaped logo was devised for the Voluntary Action Centers and used nationwide. It operated an information bank known as Clearinghouse. By October 1971, Voluntary Action Centers had been established in 32 communities, with 30 more underway and 250 other communities having expressed interest.

Wilkinson left in August 1970. Lenore Romney, George's wife, became a director of the organization, and a member of its executive committee by 1971, and vice president by 1973. Ford departed in 1972, and W. Clement Stone, who was the treasurer, became acting chair.

In 1973, as he left the Nixon administration, George Romney became chair and CEO of the National Center for Voluntary Action.

In 1976, the organization sponsored a national Congress on Volunteerism and Citizenship in conjunction with the United States Bicentennial of that year.

In 1979, the National Center for Voluntary Action merged with another organization, the Colorado-based National Information Center on Volunteerism (which had been in existence since 1970, and as the National Information Center on Volunteers in Courts, since 1967), and together became a new organization, VOLUNTEER: The National Center for Citizen Involvement. Romney remained as head of the new organization. The organization simplified its name to VOLUNTEER: The National Center in 1984 and to the National Volunteer Center in 1990. Romney remained as chair of these organizations throughout this time.

In 1991, the organization merged into the Points of Light Foundation, which had been created in 1990 under the aegis of President George H. W. Bush. The merged organization also became known during the 2000s as the Points of Light Foundation and Volunteer Center National Network. That organization then in 2007 merged with the Atlanta-based Hands On Network to become the Points of Light Institute.
