= Volunteer management =

Volunteer management, also known as volunteer engagement, volunteer coordination, and volunteer administration, refers to "the systematic and logical process of working with and through volunteers to achieve an organisation’s objectives".

== History ==
Volunteer management became an occupation during the late 1960s and early 1970s when the long-term volunteer was the prevalent type of volunteer, at least in the non-profit organisations. At that time, people volunteered as an alternative to work. When the field's founders began to try to get volunteer management recognised as a profession, they adopted a lot of standard workplace practices, such as written job descriptions and interviews, to determine the volunteer's suitability for a role. People who volunteered as an alternative to work found that these practices gave their efforts a bit more status, and they responded positively.

Energize, Inc., founded in 1977 by Susan J. Ellis, who was inspired by Naylor and Ivan Scheier, was the first publisher to specialize exclusively in volunteer management materials.

Models of volunteer management have evolved to meet the changing needs of societies around the world as well as to meet modern needs. Today, volunteer management is professionalizing. Many localities have professional associations (AVAs) and international certifications are available (ex. http://cvacert.org/).

== Practice ==
Volunteer managers typically motivate, lead and supervise volunteers at non-profit organisations as well as for governmental organisations and large-scale events like the Olympics. The role of a volunteer manager usually ranges from the operational and administrative tasks such as attendance taking to the policy-making tasks like defining volunteer job roles and recruiting and managing volunteers. Many volunteer managers also take on other roles such as being the fundraising manager for their organisations.

Virtual volunteering means managers of volunteers support and manage volunteers via email, instant messages, collaborative software or other computer and Internet tools. The United Nations Online Volunteering service, formerly NetAid, has a blog noting suggested practices in online volunteer management.

== Organisational heritage ==
Aiding volunteer management, managers have been encouraged to harness the inherent strengths of their organisation. Using an organisation's brand heritage represents one such approach. Brand heritage can enhance the engagement and subsequent satisfaction volunteers have with the way in which they are managed. Consequently, managers are called upon to first protect their volunteer organisation's brand heritage, and to utilize it as a volunteer management tool.

== Systems ==
Several experts have various stages and models for a volunteer management system but they tend to have several common features. Volunteer management usually involves planning for the role that volunteers would fill, recruiting and screening the volunteers as well as supervising and motivating the volunteers under their charge. Many volunteer management practices resemble human resource management practices, with some nonprofits and NGOs including volunteer management under the human resources department.

However, research conducted at the University of Newcastle, Australia in 2015, which interviewed volunteer managers about their roles, identified that there are significant differences between volunteer management and human resource management suggesting this profession requires a different skills set.

== See also ==
- Volunteering
- Pro bono
- International volunteering
- Virtual volunteering
