= Number Champions =

British charity

Number Champions is a British charity that aims to enhance the opportunities of young children by improving their numeracy skills and fostering a love of and fascination with numbers.

Established in 2018, it utilises the services of trained in-school volunteers to employ games and other creative activities in one-to-one sessions with children aged between 6 and 8 to help children make sense of numbers and gain confidence.

Number Champions is currently partnering with schools across London.

== Recognition ==
In 2023, Number Champions received a Points of Light award for its work from the Prime Minister’s Office at 10 Downing Street along with a personal letter of thanks to Bernard Manson, the charity’s chairman.
