= Volunteer Richmond Information Services =

Volunteer Richmond Information Services (VRIS) is a non-profit agency based in Richmond, British Columbia, Canada, where it serves a dual role as a volunteer centre and a source for community information.

== History ==
The origins of VRIS date back to 1972, when a small group of individuals connected with the Richmond Savings Credit Union (which later merged with Pacific Coast Savings Credit Union to become Coast Capital Savings) started a community information service in the cloakroom of the Credit Union's main branch. In 1986, this service, now operating out of a permanent location in Richmond Centre mall, merged with the Richmond Volunteer Centre and became the Richmond Information and Volunteer Centre. In order to accommodate a growing number of programs and clients, the agency moved to its present location at the Richmond Caring Place in 1994. In the same year, the agency changed its name to Richmond Connections. Finally, in 2001, to coincide with the International Year of the Volunteer and to better reflect its role in promoting volunteerism, Richmond Connections adopted its current name, Volunteer Richmond Information Services.

== Programs ==
Aside from the volunteer centre and information and referral service, VRIS runs several other community programs, including the Richmond Christmas Fund, Leadership Richmond, a child care resource and referral centre, and a variety of seniors programs.

=== Richmond Christmas Fund ===
Each December, the Richmond Christmas Fund provides grocery vouchers and toys to upwards of 2,500 low income families. The program is supported largely by donations from individuals and local businesses, who together contribute $120,000 to the effort annually.

=== Leadership Richmond ===
Leadership Richmond, sponsored by Coast Capital Savings since the program began in 2006, includes four components: Youth Now, which trains young adults to serve as board members for local non-profit organizations; Enterprise, which promotes employer-assisted volunteering; Next, which matches skilled volunteers aged 50+ with non-profit organizations; and Community, which provides volunteer management training to the non-profit sector. In 2007, VRIS and Coast Capital Savings received Imagine Canada's Business & Community Partnership Award for their work together on Leadership Richmond.

== 2010 Winter Olympics ==
In 2008, VRIS was contracted by the City of Richmond to deliver the Information & Volunteer Program for the 2010 Winter Olympics. This involved running a community information booth at Richmond Centre mall and recruiting, training, and managing the volunteer workforce for the Richmond O Zone, the city's celebration site during the Games. In total, 644 people volunteered at the O Zone, which attracted 500,000 visitors over the course of 17 days.
