= Robert M. Devlin =

American businessman (born 1941)

Bob Devlin
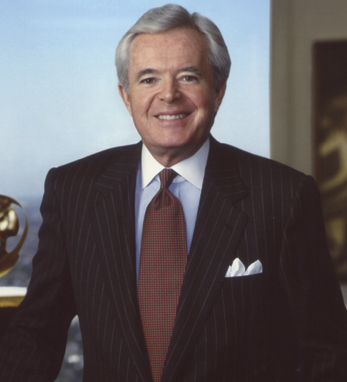
- Devlin in 2013
- Born: Robert Michael Devlin; February 28, 1941 (age 85); Brooklyn, New York City, U.S.
- Education: Tulane University (BA)
- Occupations: Businessman; investor; philanthropist
- Title: Chairman, President, and CEO of the American General Corporation
- Term: 1996–2001
- Board member of: Cooper Industries; LKQ Corporation; Discover Financial; ConocoPhillips
- Spouse: Katharine Devlin (m. 1961)
- Children: 2
- Awards: Ellis Island Medal of Honor

Robert Michael Devlin (born February 28, 1941) is an American businessman, investor, and philanthropist who was chairman, president, and CEO of the American General Corporation from 1996 to 2001. During his tenure, the company grew into one of the largest life insurance and financial services companies in the United States before its acquisition by AIG in 2001. Devlin currently sits on the board of directors of several major corporations, including: Cooper Industries, LKQ Corporation, Discover Financial, and ConocoPhillips.

Appointed by General Colin Powell in 1998, Devlin served as a member of the board of directors of America's Promise for over ten years.

== Early life and education ==
Devlin was born on February 28, 1941, in Brooklyn, New York, to Norma Hall Devlin and John M. Devlin. He grew up in Schenectady, New York, alongside three brothers and one sister.

Devlin attended Tulane University in New Orleans, Louisiana, graduating with a Bachelor of Arts degree in economics in 1964.

== Career ==
Devlin began his career in the life insurance industry after graduating from college in 1964. Working with the Mutual of New York, he joined the American General Insurance Company in 1977; he worked from Nashville, Tennessee. In 1986, Devlin relocated to Houston, Texas, to serve as the president and CEO of American General Life, a role he held until 1993. From 1993 to 1995, he was vice chairman and a director of the parent company, American General Corporation, while overseeing the purchase of Franklin Life Insurance. By 1995, he was named president and CEO of the corporation, and became chairman of the board in 1996, succeeding Harold S. Hook. The year Devlin became CEO, American General acquired Home Beneficial. The following year, American General acquired USLife Corp, making American General the "third largest" insurance company in the United States. During his tenure, American General grew from $43 billion in assets and a market capitalization of $7 billion to $123 billion in assets and a market capitalization of $24 billion. In 1999, Devlin received a $38 million salary. In August 2001, American General Corporation was acquired by American International Group (AIG) for approximately $23 billion. Devlin briefly stayed on to oversee the transition as CEO of American General under AIG before stepping down. Devlin made over $267 million from the sale. He continued to serve as deputy chairman of Prudential plc.

Following his departure from American General, Devlin co-founded Curragh Capital Partners in October 2001, a New York City-based investment firm. He also joined the financial advisory and asset management firm Lazard as a senior advisor. In February 2004, Devlin led the Devlin Group, an investment firm organized with W. R. Berkley and Rodney A. Hawes Jr., in an agreement to acquire Forethought Financial Services from Hillenbrand Industries for approximately $280 million. At the time of acquisition, Forethought was the leading provider of pre-need insurance and trust services in the United States, managing over $3 billion in assets. Devlin served as a principal owner and director of Forethought Financial Group following the transaction.

Throughout his career, Devlin has served on the board of directors for several major corporations, including: Cooper Industries (since 1997), LKQ Corporation (since 2003), Discover Financial (since 2007), and ConocoPhillips (since 2000).

=== Philanthropy ===
In addition to his business career, Devlin has served on the board of directors of numerous nonprofit organizations. He has served on the board of directors of the Museum of Fine Arts, Houston, the Holocaust Museum Houston, and the Joe Torre Safe at Home Foundation. He also serves on the executive board of the American Irish Historical Society, previously serving as co-chair alongside actor Liam Neeson.

In 1998, Devlin was appointed by General Colin Powell to the board of directors of America's Promise: an alliance of nonprofits, community organizations, businesses, and government organizations dedicated to improving the lives of young people. He served on the board until 2009.

Devlin maintains his own grant-making nonprofit, the Devlin Foundation, with assets over $13 million. He serves as a trustee of his alma mater, Tulane University, and was a trustee of Boston College from 2002 to 2010. He also serves as a trustee of St. Patrick's Cathedral in New York City.

== Awards ==
List of honors and awards of Robert M. Devlin:

- Ellis Island Medal of Honor — Awarded for business achievements and leadership.
- American Irish Historical Society Gold Medal
- Torch of Liberty Award by the Anti-Defamation League
- Joe Torre Safe at Home Foundation Hall of Fame
- Tulane University Lifetime Alumni Achievement Award

== Personal life ==
Devlin is Catholic. He married Katharine "Kate" Devlin in 1961. The couple has two sons, Michael (born 1966) and Matthew (born 1968). Devlin is of Irish descent; his great-grandfather emigrated from County Donegal to the United States in 1848. The family maintains deep ties to Ireland, including philanthropic support for the restoration of St. Mary's Church in Killybegs, County Donegal, and Paul Newman's camp in County Kildare.

=== Curragh Stables ===
Devlin owns and operates Curragh Stables, a thoroughbred horse racing stable in Saratoga Springs, New York; the stable has campaigned graded stakes-winning horses.
