= Volunteer Center =

Volunteer Centers or Volunteer Centres exist primarily to foster and develop volunteerism in the community as a whole. In general they do four things: Promote volunteerism, capacity building for effective local volunteering, provide leadership on issues relating to volunteerism, provide leadership on issues relating to volunteerism and connect people with opportunities to serve.

"Volunteer Centres" in the UK are sometimes known as "volunteer bureaux" or "volunteer development agencies". Working to a national model they provide support at a local level for individual volunteers and volunteer involving organisations. They have six core functions, which combined seek to promote and develop volunteering in local communities and link potential volunteers with volunteer involving organisations.

== See also ==
- Association for Leaders in Volunteer Engagement (ALIVE)
- Community service
- European Volunteer Centre (CEV)
- Points of Light Foundation & Volunteer Center National Network
- Volunteering
- Volunteers of America
- Volunteer Centres Ireland
