= Flavia Pansieri =

United Nations Deputy High Commissioner for Human Rights Management.

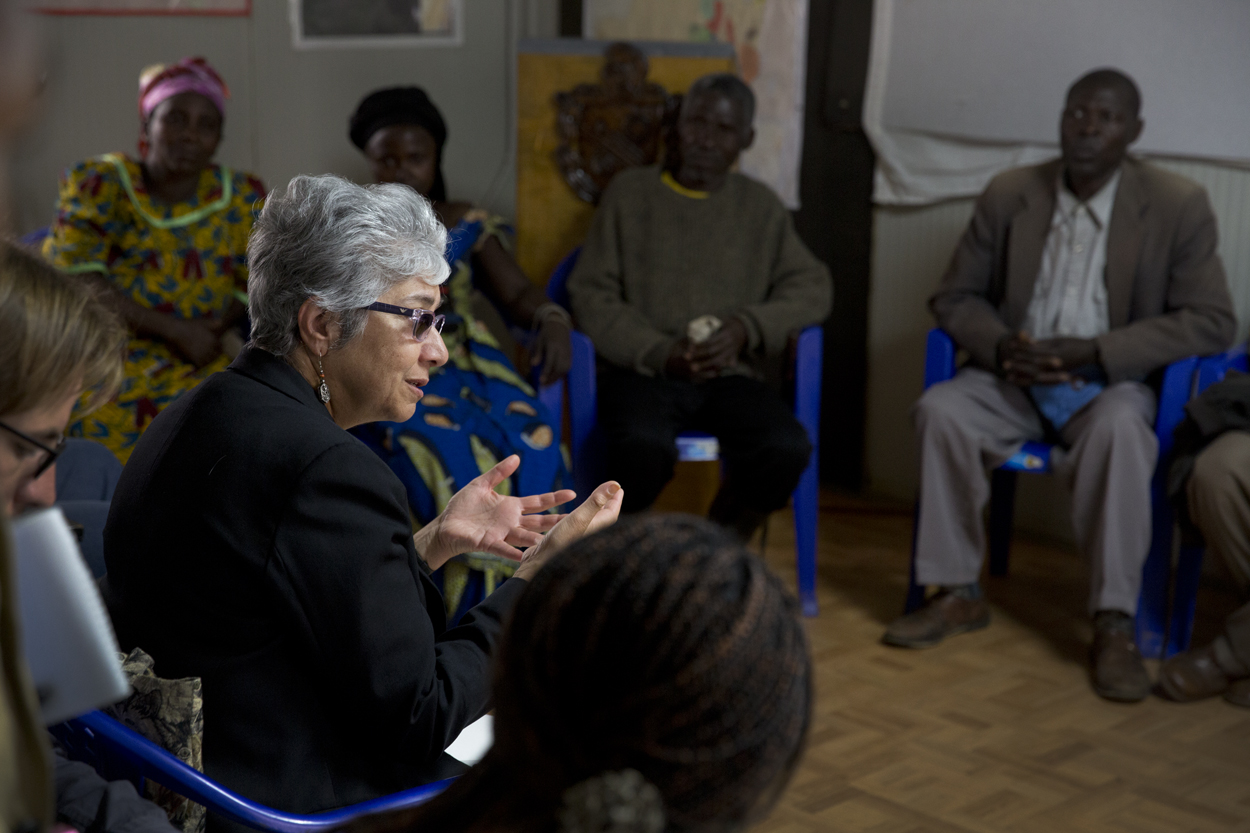

United Nations Deputy High Commissioner for Human Rights
- In office 15 March 2013 – 31 December 2015
- Preceded by: Kang Kyung-wha

Personal details
- Born: 1951 (age 74–75) Italy
- Education: University of Milan; University of Venice; University of Beijing

Flavia Pansieri was the United Nations Deputy High Commissioner for Human Rights at the level of Assistant Secretary-General. She was appointed to this position by the United Nations Secretary-General Ban Ki-moon on 15 March 2013, and resigned on 22 July 2015, departing on 31 December 2015 after the selection of her successor was announced.

== Biography ==
Pansieri first joined the United Nations through the United Nations Development Programme in 1983 in China. She later moved on to different positions within the UN system in other countries, including Bangladesh, Myanmar, and Laos, where she served as director of the UN Drug Control Programme, the predecessor of the United Nations Office on Drugs and Crime. She worked in Vienna between 1995 and 1998 and served as deputy executive director of the United Nations Development Fund for Women (UNIFEM) in New York from 1998 to 2001, when she rejoined UNDP.

Between 2001 and 2004, Pansieri headed the Country Operations Division of UNDP overseeing all programming activities in the Arab region, at the point in time when the region started being at the centre of attention following the publication of the UNDP Arab Human Development Report and the 11 September terrorist attacks in the USA.

From 2004 to 2008, Pansieri served as United Nations Resident Coordinator and United Nations Development Programme (UNDP) Resident Representative in Yemen. Commenting on the country's development challenges, she said much greater efforts needed to be made to reduce corruption and improve governance mechanisms in order to promote investment in the country. She also described how she was inspired by volunteerism, which she said was essential to achieving development goals. In 2005, she was the first to volunteer as an International Observer for a polio immunization campaign in Yemen.

Pansieri went on to serve as Executive Coordinator of the United Nations Volunteers programme (UNV) from 2008 to 2013. At UNV she oversaw the first State of the World’s Volunteerism Report in 2011. Presenting the report, Pansieri said that volunteers can and do make significant contributions to peace and development, and that there is a clear relationship between volunteerism and societal well-being. She also said that a volunteer’s engagement “is not a condescending act of charity,” but rather recognition of a reciprocal and mutually beneficial relationship.

As the UN Deputy High Commissioner for Human Rights from 2013–2015, Pansieri was outspoken on a variety of human rights challenges around the world.

In 2013, she returned to Yemen on an official visit amidst the unrest following the stepping-down of the former president Ali Abdullah Saleh, who had been granted immunity. Pansieri called for accelerated efforts to advance transitional justice and national reconciliation measures, saying that the "future of Yemen cannot be built on [a foundation of] impunity for past violations – whenever and wherever they occurred."

In 2014, Pansieri spoke out against the Cambodian government’s ban on demonstrations, which she said fell short of "the test of legality, necessity and proportionality.” She also expressed her concern that the overall human rights situation in the country had deteriorated following the 2013 elections, especially in regard to freedom of expression and assembly.

In Bosnia and Herzegovina, Pansieri asserted that it was important for countries to support efforts to uncover the fate of missing persons following armed conflict and war, stating that “at the heart of the obligations of States to determine the fate and whereabouts of persons who are unaccounted for is the right to the truth." The absence of such truth, she said, could undermine relationships between communities for generations.

In September 2014, speaking at a special session of the Human Rights Council on the human rights situation in Iraq, Pansieri reported that the Islamic State (IS) was believed to have carried out "acts of inhumanity on an unimaginable scale", and that evidence suggested Iraqi government forces may also have committed human rights violations. She also condemned the persecution of Christians, Yazidis, Turkmen and other ethnic groups by IS forces, saying that IS had "ruthlessly carried out what may amount to ethnic and religious cleansing."

In 2015, Pansieri presented a report describing the negative impact of the global drug problem on human rights. In an interview about the report with Swedish Television News, she said she was surprised to see that Sweden lagged behind other countries in terms of its drug policies. She went on to defend the report's recommendations, which included decriminalizing drug possession and use, embracing “harm reduction” approaches when dealing with drug dependent persons, and considering the rights of indigenous peoples to follow traditional practices that may involve drug use. She said that to much of the international community, such policies were no longer controversial.

Also in 2015, Pansieri made an official visit to Colombia, where she stressed that even after 50 years of war, it was important for Colombians not to give up on the peace process, no matter the obstacles and setbacks that may continue to occur. She also described how women, indigenous peoples, and afro-descendants, among others, had suffered disproportionately throughout the country's extended conflict "not just because of the conflict, but because of a system that has historically discriminated and dispossessed them."

As the UN Deputy High Commissioner for Human Rights, Pansieri also condemned what she said were human rights violations in the Israeli-Palestinian conflict.

Pansieri decided to retire from her position on 22 July 2015, citing health reasons. She continued to carry out her functions until she officially retired on 31 December 2015.

In recognition of her over 30 years of committed professional engagement with the United Nations and her contributions to peace and development, Flavia Pansieri received on 9 November 2018 a “Special Career Recognition” within the context of the Venice Golden Lion for Peace Prize.

== French Peacekeeper Sex Abuse Investigation ==
For months, top UN human rights officials (Pansieri being one of them) knew about allegations of child sex abuse by French soldiers in the Central African Republic. Although the UN and Pansieri had a responsibility to follow up these allegations they failed to do so. Pansieri admitted that she had not given the investigation into sexual abuse of children by French peacekeepers the necessary attention. She stated that she had assumed that French authorities were handling the matter, despite repeated requests for additional information from French authorities. No action was taken until Anders Kompass, the Geneva-based UN human rights staffer informed French authorities by transmitting a report to the French Government with covering letter shedding light on the alleged abuses. However, Pansieri responded with a statement demanding the whistleblower's resignation. When Kompass refused to do so, he was suspended.
