= The NonProfit Times =

Newspaper covering management of non-profit organizations in the United States

- Type: Trade newspaper
- Owner: Nonprofit Times Publishing Group
- Founded: April 1987; 38 years ago
- Language: English
- City: Morris Plains, New Jersey
- Country: United States
- ISSN: 0896-5048
- Website: www.thenonprofittimes.com

The NonProfit Times (NPT) is a newspaper based in Morris Plains, New Jersey, covering the business management of non-profit organizations in the United States. The first issue was published in April 1987. The newspaper covers fundraising, accounting, managerial issues and human resource management. In addition to providing news and management tips to non-profits, the publication offers a job search engine, salary surveys, and an online TV show called The NonProfit Times TV.

== Services ==
=== Power And Influence Top 50 ===
The NonProfit Times releases a list of the nonprofit executives every year. Recent honorees include the late Peter Goldberg, Paul Shoemaker, and Scott Harrison. Those who are included in the link are honored with a gala at The National Press Club. The gala for the 2011 honorees occurred on September 15.

=== The NonProfit Times TV ===
In September 2010, The NonProfit Times launched a bi-weekly webcast called The NonProfit Times TV. Each webcast runs at less than seven minutes, and covers the top news in the nonprofit sector. In addition, each episode includes an interview with a top executive at a nonprofit organization.

=== Salary Surveys ===
At the end of 2010, NPT released a series of salary survey reports designed to help nonprofit organizations with their compensation issues. The IRS requires nonprofit organizations to report the Compensation of Officers, Directors, Trustees, Key Employees, Highest Compensated Employees, and Independent Contractors on Part VII of Form 990 each year. The info included in these salary surveys will help organizations deal with these requirements.

=== Website Redesign ===
On March 6, 2013, NPT launched its redesigned website, featuring an improved search function and other factors. According to NPT President/CEO John McIlquham, the relaunch was part of "a year-long effort to meet the information needs of our readers and advertising partners.”

=== Job Service ===
In 2010, The NonProfit Times added a job board called Nonprofit Jobseeker. The site lists the latest jobs from nonprofit organizations from all over the United States. The site is free to use for job seekers, though employers that wish to list their job openings have to pay a fee depending on the type of job package they choose.

On March 6, 2013, as part of the overall site re-design, the Nonprofit Job Seeker was integrated into the publication's main website.

=== "On Volunteers" ===
Susan J. Ellis was responsible for the bi-monthly column, “On Volunteers,” in The NonProfit Times from 1990 to 2015.
