= Paani Project =

American nonprofit organization

Paani
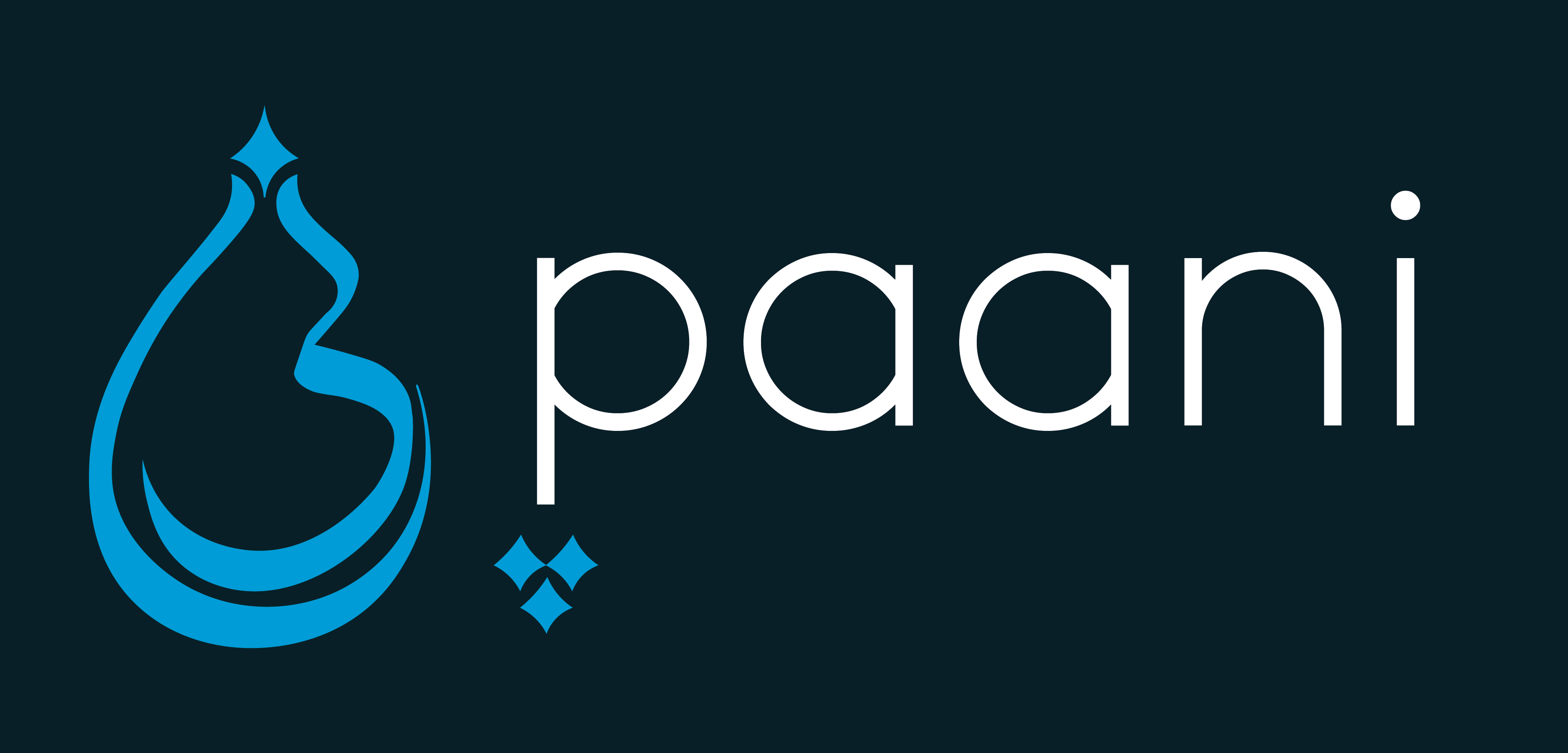
- Founded: 2017; 9 years ago
- Type: International NGO
- Location: Michigan, U.S.
- Region served: Pakistan, Jordan
- Fields: Humanitarian aid and activism; Sustainable aid; Mothers and children affected by the Pakistan crisis
- CEO: Sikander 'Sonny' Khan
- Website: www.paaniproject.org

Paani is an American nonprofit humanitarian organization that provides water aid, emergency assistance and disaster relief in Pakistan. Its headquarters are located in Michigan, United States and it is managed by volunteers. As of 2024, Paani operates in Pakistan and Jordan and has raised over $7 million. Paani has built over 20,000 water wells, and delivered millions of meals to rural families in Pakistan.

== History ==
Paani, which means water in Urdu, was founded in 2017 at the University of Michigan and operated by student volunteers who aim to alleviate the water and sanitation crisis in Pakistan.

Paani has focused largely on the most disadvantaged families in various districts of Sindh including Jacobabad, Mirpurkhas, Jaffarabad and Tharparkar. In response to COVID-19 pandemic in Pakistan, the non-profit has distributed over a million dollars of medical supplies to clinics including ventilators, electrocardiogram machines, cardiac monitors, and face masks to hospitals in Pakistan.

The non-profit has built wells in honor of George Floyd and Mohammad Anwar.

In July 2021, the organization worked with NBA superstar Kyrie Irving to build a solar water center in Pakistan. This effort drew praise from the Consulate General of the United States, Karachi.

During the summer of 2022, founder Sikander 'Sonny' Khan received The Diana Award and the Daily Point of Light Award for his efforts in creating Paani.

In August 2022, the organization built a school for child Afghan refugees in Swabi through a viral donation from DraftKings CEO Jason Robins. The school is expected to serve approximately 175 students over the next five years.

In September 2023, the Clinton Global Initiative selected Paani as one of 30 organizations for the CGI Greenhouse, an opportunity to accelerate partnerships for mission-driven entrepreneurs with strategic, intersectional approaches to addressing global challenges.

In November 2023, Khan was named in the Forbes 30 Under 30 list. In March 2024, Khan received the Diana Legacy Award from William, Prince of Wales for his humanitarian efforts.

== Operations ==
=== Water Projects ===
Paani conducts needs assessments to determine the most beneficial type of well for each community. Approximately 65% of the wells built are hand pumps, 30% are deep wells, and 5% use solar power or reverse osmosis. The organization partners with local construction companies and ensures fair compensation for laborers involved in well construction.

Paani relies on a number of contacts including local construction companies to build the wells, while producing jobs for the unemployed. At the completion of each well, local community members are trained on the maintenance process to ensure longevity of the wells.

The organization helped 7,551 families of three tehsils of Tharparkar district from 400 deep water wells and five solar-powered water wells in Pakistan, however across Pakistan the number is much larger.

=== Women's Empowerment ===
Paani has established a Women's Center offering skills training and vocational programs. As of 2023, 40 women are undergoing training in handcrafts and sewing. The center aims to promote gender equality and enhance socio-economic well-being.

In Tharparkar, Paani's solar-powered water facilities have enabled women to grow gardens, further supporting their economic independence.

=== Emergency Responses ===
Paani has responded to various emergencies in Pakistan:

- 2019 Earthquake in Kashmir: Distributed emergency clothing and bedding
- 2020 Karachi Floods: Provided cooked meals and clean water via water tankers to affected neighborhoods
- COVID-19 pandemic: Supplied food and hygiene kits to over 4,000 families (each averaging 7 members), and $500,000 in medical supplies including ventilators, electrocardiogram machines, and cardiac monitors to health clinics in Lahore, including the Pakistan Kidney and Liver Institute
- 2022 Pakistan floods: Raised over $1.2 million for relief efforts, building water wells, constructing homes, and distributing food packages in the most affected areas

== Transparency and Accountability ==
Paani emphasizes transparency in its operations. When a donation is made for a well, the donor receives a Google Drive album of 60 photos and a video documenting the entire process, including photos of community members benefiting from the final result.

The organization maintains zero overhead costs, ensuring all donations are directed to supported rural communities. During the COVID-19 pandemic, Paani adhered to regulations set by the Inter-Agency Standing Committee of the United Nations for safe food distribution

Paani aims to improve donor engagement by connecting them with beneficiaries on the ground, allowing donors to feel involved in the process even after making their contribution.

== Fundraising ==
Paani began with students raising funds by selling donuts at the Michigan Union, raising $600 for their first water well. The organization now conducts most of its fundraising through online platforms like LaunchGood and online donations via their website.

Approximately 80% of Paani's fundraising occurs during Ramadan. Notable campaigns include:

- 2021: Raised $905,155
- 2023: Raised over $1.26 million for flood relief

Paani has also engaged celebrities in campaigns, including a 2021 Ramadan video featuring Phill Lewis, Lindsay Lohan, Drake Bell, and Tony Hawk, which received millions of views across social media platforms.

The organization has raised over $5 million while maintaining $0 in overhead.

== Notable Supporters ==
- Bushra Amiwala
- Rabia Chaudry
- Abdul El-Sayed
- Jeremy McLellan
- Tony Hawk
- Kyrie Irving
- Lindsay Lohan
- J. B. Pritzker
- Jason Robins
- Amjad Saqib
- Mark Schlissel
- Sabaa Tahir
