= Bunkers in Baghdad =

American non-profit organization

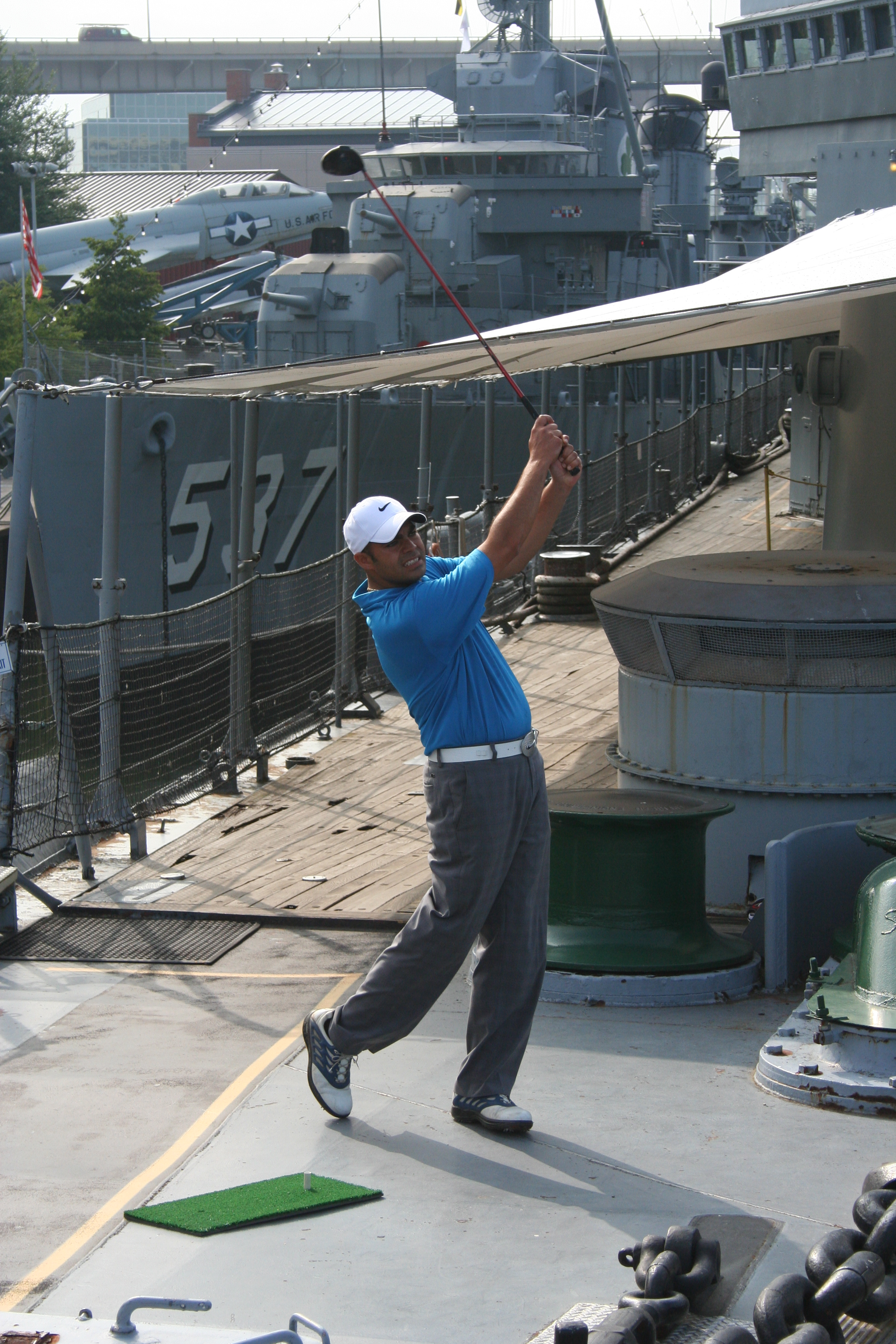
Joseph M. Hanna

Bunkers in Baghdad is an American charity organization that ships golf balls, clubs, and other equipment to active-duty American troops stationed around the world and to veterans recuperating stateside. Founded in 2008 by Buffalo, New York-based attorney Joseph M. Hanna, it has shipped nearly 8 million golf balls and 575,000 clubs to troops in 65 countries. Corporate supporters include Callaway Golf, Arnold Palmer Enterprises, TopGolf, and Delaware North, among many others.

== Activities ==
According to the charity's website, it is run "100% on donations – from the equipment that is generously donated to the funds required to pay for shipping to our troops." It holds an annual golf tournament in Akron, New York that stands as its biggest fundraiser for the year, but also holds events in Chicago, Dallas, Houston, and Miami. Its Bunkers Buddies program works with more than 400 schools across the country to fundraise, collect equipment, and hold letter-writing campaigns for troops stationed overseas.

== History ==
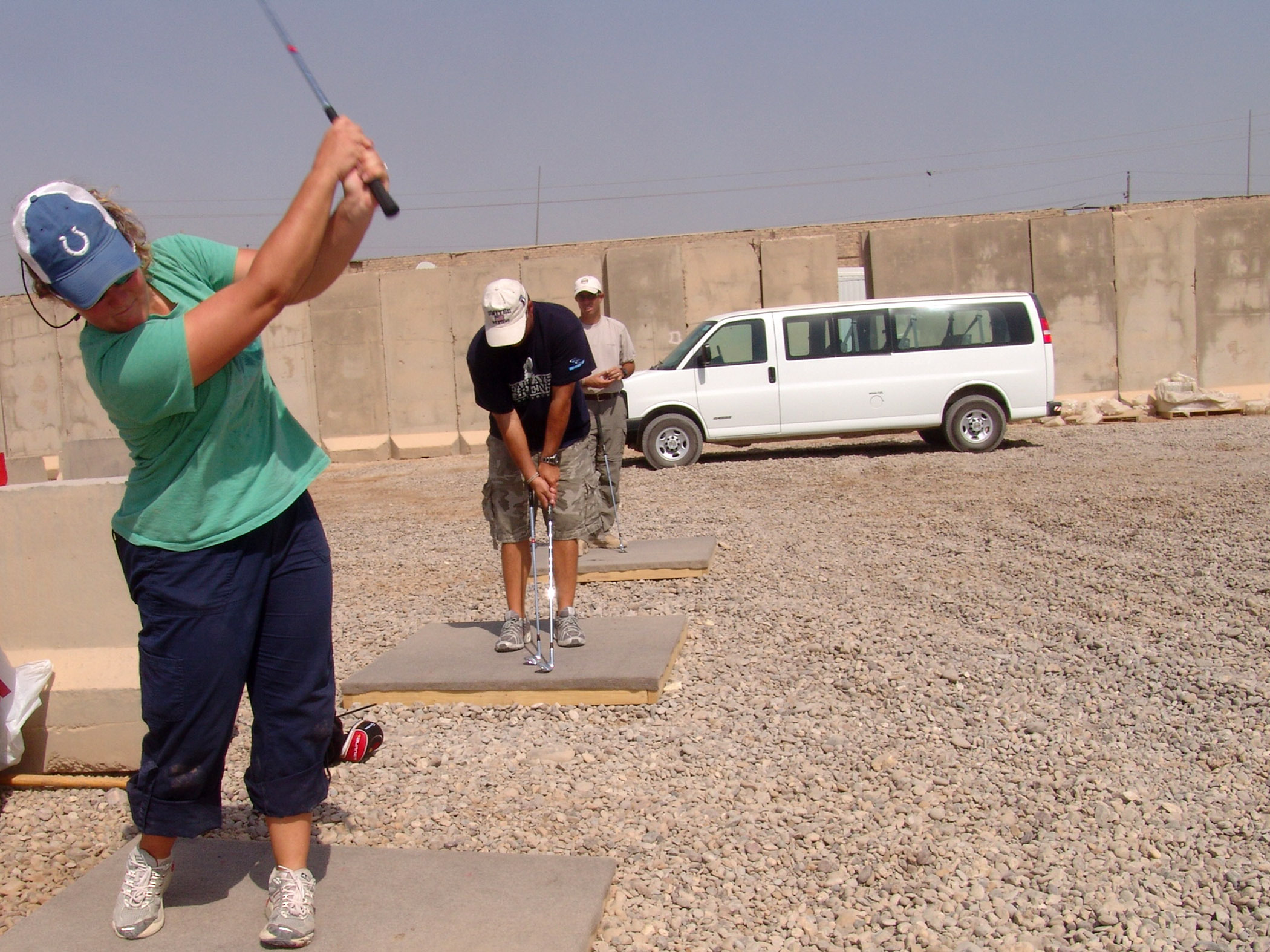
Golf pros, from left, Becky Lucidi, Carl Paulson and Mike Sposa show off their skills to Soldiers of the 30th Heavy Brigade Combat Team at Forward Operating Base Falcon, Iraq, Aug. 19.

Hanna, a partner at Goldberg Segalla, told Golf Digest in a 2013 profile that he was inspired to start the charity after watching a news segment about the living conditions of American soldiers in Iraq. "I had an idea, and like ideas that have the best chance of succeeding, it was simple: I would collect clubs and balls and send them to Iraq so soldiers could relax after a day in the zone, same as me," he said. As of May 2016, the charity was shipping an average of 73,000 golf balls per month.
