= LKQ Corporation =

Automotive Parts Supplier

- Type: Public
- Traded as: Nasdaq: LKQ; S&P 600 component
- Industry: Auto parts
- Founded: February 1998; 28 years ago
- Founder: Donald F. Flynn
- Headquarters: Nashville, Tennessee, U.S.
- Key people: Justin Jude (president and CEO)
- Revenue: ▼$ 13.65 billion (2025)
- Net income: ▼$ 608 million (2025)
- Owner: ValueAct Capital, 7.1%
- Number of employees: 44,000 (2022)
- Subsidiaries: Keystone Automotive
- Website: lkqcorp.com

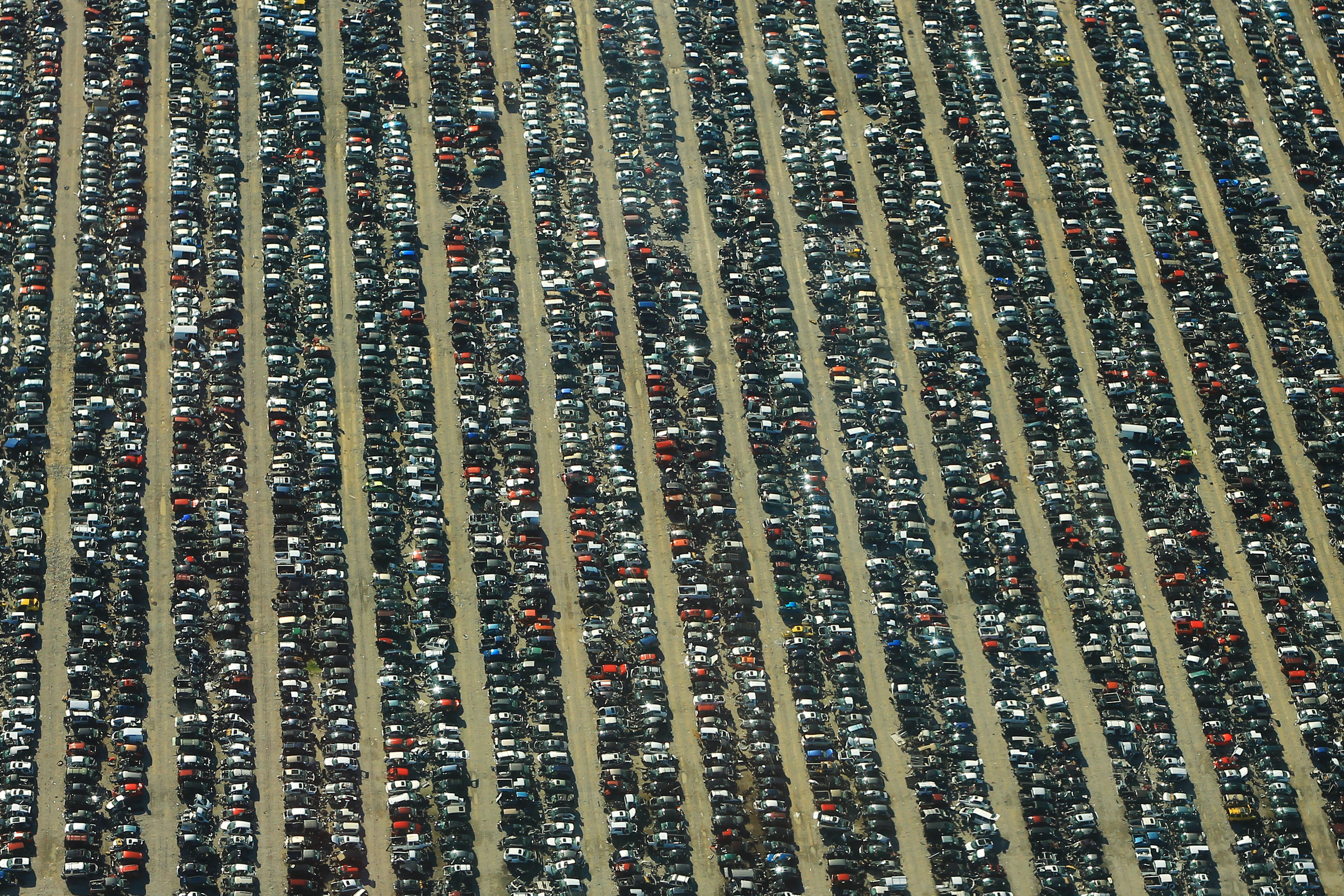
LKQ wrecking yard in Texas

LKQ Corporation (“Like, Kind and Quality”) is an American provider of alternative and speciality parts to repair and accessorize automobiles and other vehicles. LKQ has operations in North America, Europe and Taiwan. LKQ sells replacement systems, components, equipment and parts to repair and accessorize automobiles, trucks, and recreational and performance vehicles.

In December 2018, it was #300 on the list Fortune 500. In March 2017, Dominick P. Zarcone was selected to become the new president and chief executive officer.

In June 2024 Justin Jude was selected to become the new president and chief executive officer.

== History ==
LKQ Corporation was founded by Donald Flynn in February 1998, with the purchase of Triplett Automotive Recycling in Akron, Ohio. Flynn remained chairman of the corporation until his death in October 2011. Since inception, it has greatly expanded, primarily through over 200 acquisitions of used and refurbished auto parts suppliers and manufacturers. Some major acquisitions made by LKQ are Stahlgruber, Rhiag, Euro Car Parts, Fource ADL and others.

In January 2017, LKQ Corporation announced they would be moving their headquarters of North America to the Antioch section of Nashville, Tennessee. They planned to move roughly four hundred employees to the new Antioch headquarters from Illinois and California. The new headquarters officially opened in December 2018.

== Presence ==
The company is represented at a total of 1,684 locations in countries in Europe and North America.

Locations by country (June 2024)
Country	Locations
Austria	20
Belgium	24
Bosnia and Herzegovina	30
Canada	42
Czech Republic	188
Germany	146
Hungary	25
Ireland	27
Italy	3
Netherlands	86
Norway	3
Poland	53
Slovakia	61
Slovenia	3
Sweden	11
Switzerland	69
Ukraine	38
United Kingdom	270
United States	585
Total	1,684
