= International Year of Volunteers =

United Nations General Assembly initiative in favour of volunteering

The International Year of Volunteers was designated for 2001 by the United Nations General Assembly. The initiative aimed at increased recognition, facilitation, networking and promotion of volunteering, to highlight the achievements of the millions of volunteers worldwide who devote their time to serving others, and to encourage more people globally to engage in volunteering.

== Origins ==
The concept for a United Nations year to recognize volunteerism first emerged within the UN system at a 1996 policy forum in Japan by UNV and United Nations University (UNU). A February 1997 proposal of the Government of Japan was transmitted through the UN Secretary General be placed on the agenda of the Economic and Social Council (ECOSOC) in July 1997. ECOSOC, in its resolution 1977/44 of 22 July 1997, recommended to the UN General Assembly that it adopt the resolution proclaiming 2001 the International Year of Volunteers. The UN General Assembly, in its 52nd session on 20 November 1997 in Resolution 52/17, co-sponsored by 123 countries, passed the ECOSOC resolution, thereby proclaiming 2001 as the International Year of Volunteers. The United Nations Volunteers programme (UNV), part of the United Nations Development Programme (UNDP), was designated in the resolution as the international focal point.

== Objectives ==
Objectives of IYV were:

- increased recognition of volunteers and their contributions
- increased facilitation and support for volunteerism
- promoting the achievements of volunteers
- "attracting more requests for the deployment of volunteers, at attracting offers of service from new candidates with a view to enhancing operational activities, and generally creating a climate of public and official opinion even more supportive of voluntary action"

== Administration ==
Sharon Capeling-Alakija was the Executive Coordinator of United Nations Volunteers during IYV 2001. As the international focal point, UNV, based in Bonn, Germany, took the lead in all organizing and promotion regarding the year internationally.

The www.iyv2001.org website, launched in December 1998 by UNV, provided resources for United Nations organizations, non-governmental organizations and governments to recognize the year in some way. The resources provided by the site included:

- an IYV overview slide presentation
- a slide presentation on IYV national committees
- a side presentation on planning
- IYV banners/graphics for web pages
- suggestions on local IYV activities and partnerships

The IYV logo was a creation and volunteer contribution from Argentine designer Sandra Rojas and was provided in the six official UN languages as well as a composite logo that combines all six in one.

== Programs ==
UN Secretary-General Kofi Annan opened IYV in November 2000 in New York. Other speakers at the event included Capeling-Alakija; Felipe VI of Spain (then Prince of Asturias; Nadia Comaneci, Olympic Gold Medalist; representatives from the governments of Japan, Uganda and Brazil; Dr. Astrid Heiberg, then President of the International Federation of Red Cross and Red Crescent Societies (IFRC); Anita Roddick, then CEO of The Body Shop; Bernard Kouchner, then of UNMIK in Kosovo; Sergio Vieira de Mello, then of UNTAET in East Timor; UN Volunteers from the Philippines and Nigeria; and representatives from NetAid. Annan also appointed the former President of Ghana, Jerry Rawlings, as the first IYV Eminent Person, to help raise the profile of millions of volunteers working for peace and development around the world. Other IYV Eminent Persons named for the year included Crown Prince Felipe, Roddick, and the former Executive Director of the United Nations Population Fund (UNFPA), Dr. Nafis Sadik.

At the Word Volunteer Conference in Amsterdam, in honor of IYV, the International Association for Volunteer Effort re-issued a revised Universal Declaration on Volunteering, first issued in 1990 during the World Volunteer Conference in Paris. "This Declaration supports the right of every woman, man and child to associate freely and to volunteer regardless of their cultural and ethnic origin, religion, age, gender, and physical, social or economic condition."

Individual countries also created their own national IYV websites, and events were held around the world to promote the goals of IYV, such as the official launch event in New York City.

In the US, the Points of Light Foundation and the Association of Junior Leagues International (AJLI) partnered to convene and lead the IYV USA Steering Committee. Members of the committee included the National Council of Volunteer Centers, National Council on Workplace Volunteering, Association for Volunteer Administration, National Parents and Teachers Association and Make A Difference Day. The USA's IYV website, www.iyv2001us.org, was launched in September 2000.

On 29 March 2001, the United Nations Postal Administration (UNPA) issued a set of six commemorative stamps and a souvenir card in honor of IYV.

Four IYV 2001 Stamps were issued by the Bhutan Post on June 15.

The Royal Australian Mint struck a $1 coin to commemorate the occasion. A number of volunteer organizations (e.g. South Australia Fire Services, New Zealand Emergrency Services and St. Andrew's First Aid struck and issued a medal to commemorate IYV to its volunteers.

Charles, Prince of Wales unveiled the design of a 10-cent Canadian circulation coin commemorating IYV in April 2001. The coin went into circulation later that year. It was produced by Royal Canadian Mint and adapted from a photo provided by the March of Dimes.

According to a press release by UNV in October 2001, lawmakers in France, Germany, Spain and the UK passed pro-volunteer legislation in 2001, and new laws were proposed in Argentina, Colombia, Ecuador, Madagascar, Mozambique, Nepal, Senegal and Tanzania. Also for the year, UNV and the Independent Sector released "Measuring Volunteering: A Practical Toolkit", a survey guide to measure the economic contribution of volunteering. The press release says the toolkit was adapted for use in Botswana, China, Lao PDR, Kazakhstan and Mongolia, and that research on volunteering had begun in Cambodia, Madagascar, Namibia, Sri Lanka and Tanzania.

Solicited by UNV, musicians from around the world donated and wrote songs about volunteerism, submitting them to UNV for possible inclusion on the IYV2001 website and in a CD. Chosen songs were offered via the website to download for free. UNV also offered a CD with 27 songs in nine languages, by musicians from 18 countries, in celebration of IYV. The CD featured Jamaican reggae star Tony Rebel, who donated the song, "Not all about money", and Portugal's Paulo de Carvalho, who donated the song "Vai e faz" (Go and Do). Most of the songs praised the virtues of volunteers, but the last song, by Dave Greenfield of Canada, was meant to provoke political debate and question social issues about volunteers.

The United Colors of Benetton's communication campaign for autumn 2001 was produced in collaboration with UNV and honored IYV. Instead of professional models, the campaign featured photos of volunteers, such as a tattooed former member of a street gang who volunteered in anti-violence activities, a young lawyer volunteering to promote and defend human rights, a trans-gendered person who volunteered to distribute condoms amongst prostitutes, and an elderly tap dancer who entertained residents in homes for the elderly. The campaign was promoted throughout Europe, the United States, South America and parts of Asia, in newspapers, magazines, and billboards. A special issue of Benetton's magazine Colors was published for the campaign in November 2001.

The final event for the year by UNV, the International Symposium on Volunteering, was 18–21 November 2001 in Geneva, Switzerland. The event was attended by representatives from most of the IYV national committees and provided workshops to discuss the outcomes of IYV 2001.

Then Pope John Paul II issued a statement on 5 December 2001, noting, "At the end of the year, that the United Nations dedicated to Volunteer work, I wish to express my heartfelt appreciation for your constant dedication, in every part of the world, in going to meet those who live in poverty. Whether you work individually or gathered together in special associations, you represent for children, the elderly, the sick, people in difficulty, refugees and the persecuted a ray of hope that pierces the darkness of solitude and encourages them to overcome the temptations of violence and egotism."

The General Assembly marked the closing of IYV on 5 December 2001 by adopting a resolution on recommendations for volunteer action, commending the ongoing contributions of all volunteers to society, and encouraging all people to become more engaged in voluntary activities. The assembly also decided that two plenary meetings at its fifty-seventh session on 5 December 2002 should be devoted to the outcome of the IYV and its follow-up. Specific recommendations on ways governments and the UN system could support volunteering were contained in an annex to the resolution.

Worldwide volunteer activities of the Vienna-based NGO community were presented at the Vienna International Centre on 11 December 2001 to mark IYV 2001 and the International Day of Human Rights, jointly organized by the United Nations Information Service Vienna (UNIS) and CONGO (Conference of NGOs in consultative relationship with the UN).

== European Year of Volunteering ==
The European Year of Volunteering (EYV) was in 2011, launched by the European Commission to celebrate the volunteerism efforts of Europeans and chosen to correspond with the 10th anniversary of IYV. It was originally an initiative of the EYV 2011 Alliance, an informal gathering of volunteer networks, such as Caritas, the International Committee of the Red Cross, European Youth Forum and the Centre for European Volunteering. The web site address was www.europa.eu/volunteering, and the site is now archived on the European Commission website.

For 2021, the ten year anniversary of EYV, the Centre for European Volunteering have launched an EYVPlus10 campaign, firstly as a reflection on what has been achieved in the legacy of EYV 2011, but also as a response to the call to action which came from the UN Global Technical Meeting on volunteering "how to enable volunteering to be a transformative force for the 2030 Agenda and the SDGs". The anniversary is also seeing many countries, such as the Netherlands and Hungary, hosting their own, national years of volunteering.

== Plus 10 ==
In 2011, ten years after IYV, under General Assembly Resolution 63/153 (2008) the United Nations IYV+10 was recognized and promoted by UNV to renew the goals of the original IYV and to encourage people's contributions to peace and the Millennium Development Goals through volunteering. National and international UN Volunteers, as well as online volunteers, were recruited to support work on IYV+10, strengthen links with stakeholders and partners at the national level, and monitor initiatives developed during the Year. Activities were promoted via the UNV website, www.worldvolunteerweb.org. During the first half of 2011, a series of five regional consultation meetings were organized in Ecuador (28–20 March), Turkey (18–19 April), the Philippines (3–4 May), and Senegal (30–31 May for Francophone Africa and 6–7 June for Anglophone Africa). These events brought together hundreds of stakeholders from civil society, the private sector, national authorities and academia, UNV Field Units and other United Nations entities. A global conference on 'Volunteering for a sustainable future' was held 15–17 September in Budapest in partnership with the IFC and the International Association for Volunteer Effort. The conference brought together UN member states and volunteer-involving organizations, plus partners from academia and the private sector. The 64th Annual UN DPI/NGO Conference was held from 3–5 September hosted by the German government and the city of Bonn. The event theme was "Sustainable Societies, Responsive Citizens".

== International Volunteer Year 2026 ==
25 years after the original IYV, 2026 was designated by the United Nations as International Volunteer Year (IVY).

″The International Year of Volunteers for Sustainable Development in 2026 is a call for UN Member States to make volunteerism an integral cog in their development pathways to drive forward the Global Goals -- and a recognition that only through collective action and solidarity can we summon the strength to address the challenges that affect us all." -- UNDP Administrator, Achim Steiner.

As with the original year, UNV is the lead agency for this international year and provides resources to help others leverage the year to promote volunteerism.

== See also ==
- European Volunteer Centre
- Global Youth Service Day
- International Volunteer Day
- Mandela Day
- Mitzvah Day International
- National Volunteer Week
- Random Acts of Kindness Day
- Sewa Day
- Subbotnik
- World Kindness Day
