= Education Week =

Education news publication

- Type: Newspaper
- Format: Broadsheet
- Owner(s): Editorial Projects in Education, Inc.
- Founder: Ronald A. Wolk
- President: Michele J. Givens (and CEO)
- Editor-in-chief: Beth Frerking
- Managing editor: Sean Cavanagh
- Number of employees: 94 (2023)
- Founded: September 7, 1981; 44 years ago
- Political alignment: Nonpartisan
- Language: English
- Headquarters: Bethesda, MD
- ISSN: 0277-4232
- OCLC number: 07579948
- Website: edweek.org

Education Week is a news publication that has covered K–12 education since 1981. It is owned by Editorial Projects in Education (EPE), a nonprofit organization, and is headquartered in Bethesda, Maryland.

The newspaper publishes 37 issues a year, including three annual reports (Quality Counts, Technology Counts, and Leaders to Learn From). From 1997 to 2010, Quality Counts was sponsored by the Pew Charitable Trusts.

== History ==
In 1962, Ronald Wolk wrote a report for Editorial Projects in Education (EPE), a nonprofit organization. Wolk, who was on leave from his job as editor of the Johns Hopkins University alumni bulletin, recommended a “communications vehicle for college and university trustees.” In 1966, EPE established the Chronicle of Higher Education.

In 1978, EPE sold the Chronicle to its editors. Using the proceeds, EPE began Education Week, in 1981.

Cofounders, Ronald Wolk and Martha Matzke, wanted Education Week to be a version of the Chronicle, but focused on kindergarten through 12th grade. Wolk was Education Week’s first publisher and editor in chief. Matzke was later named executive editor.

The first issue of Education Week appeared on September 7, 1981.

Education Week staff formed a union in November 2023, and ratified their first collective bargaining agreement with management in December 2025.

== Projects ==
In addition to publishing a newspaper, Education Week conducts surveys and publishes research.

Phi Delta Kappan, a journal for education, called Education Week's school-closing tracker "a go-to resource for education reporters."
