= NetAid =

Anti-poverty initiative and nonprofit organization

NetAid was an anti-poverty initiative. It started as a joint venture between the United Nations Development Programme and Cisco Systems. It became an independent nonprofit organization in 2001. In 2007, NetAid became a part of Mercy Corps.

== Launch concerts ==
NetAid began with a concert event on 9 October 1999 with simultaneous activities meant to harness the Internet to raise money and awareness for the Jubilee 2000 campaign. Concerts took place at Wembley Stadium in London, Giants Stadium in New Jersey and the Palais des Nations in Geneva. The Wembley show was at capacity; the U.S. show suffered from very poor ticket sales.

Performers at Wembley Stadium included: Eurythmics, The Corrs, Catatonia, Bush, Bryan Adams, George Michael, David Bowie, Stereophonics and Robbie Williams.

Performers at Giants Stadium included: Sheryl Crow, Jimmy Page, Busta Rhymes, Counting Crows, Bono, Puff Daddy, The Black Crowes, Wyclef Jean, Jewel, Mary J. Blige, Cheb Mami, Sting, Slash, Lil' Kim, Lil' Cease, and Zucchero.

Performers in Geneva included: Bryan Ferry, Texas, Des'ree and Ladysmith Black Mambazo.

The NetAid website, originally at www.netaid.org, received over 2.4 million hits and raised $830,000 from 80 countries. Cisco sponsored the concerts and the web site. Along with Kofi Annan, Keyur Patel, MD of KPMG Consulting spearheaded the technology architecture development of the web site, and Anaal Udaybabu (Gigabaud Studios, San Francisco) designed the user experience.

Wyclef Jean released a charity single featuring Bono entitled "New Day" coinciding with NetAid. The song also has an accompanying music video that premiered on MTV's Total Request Live (USA) on September 21, 1999, although the video never charted.

== After the Concerts ==
Robert Piper of UNDP served as a manager of the NetAid initiative for its launch in 1999.

Following the concerts, NetAid was spun out of Cisco as an independent entity and tried various approaches to raising awareness of extreme poverty and raising money for anti-poverty projects undertaken by other organizations, through a variety of different NetAid campaigns.

In 2000, NetAid launched an online volunteering matching service on its website, in partnership with the United Nations Volunteers programme, then under the direction of Sharon Capeling-Alakija. The volunteering section of the web site, managed by UNV staff, allowed non-governmental organizations (NGOs) and UN-affiliated projects serving the developing world to recruit and involve online volunteers in various projects. UNV took ownership of the online volunteering portion of the service in 2004, moving it to its own URL at onlinevolunteering.org.

In February 2001, Time magazine and NetAid announced a pioneering initiative aimed at collecting donations through Palm VII handheld computers, allowing volunteers collect credit card data from friends and input the information into the NetAid web site via these newly-wireless devices. The experiment "pushes the envelope for Web-based charities, according to analysts, who said the bid to turn handhelds into virtual wallets faces some significant hurdles--for example, guaranteeing the privacy and security of contributors."

As an incubator for civic technology, NetAid explored the use of videogames for social change, co-founding the Games for Change movement in 2004. NetAid's work with games was initially offline, beginning with the "NetAid World Class" board game, which piloted in California, Massachusetts and New York in 2003. In 2004, NetAid co-produced a game with Cisco Systems called "Peter Packet," which addresses how the Internet can help fight poverty, focusing on issues of basic education, clean drinking water, and HIV-AIDS.

By 2006, NetAid had narrowed its focus to raising awareness among high school students in the USA regarding poverty in developing countries.

The different campaigns of NetAid are chronicled through archived versions of its web site, www.netaid.org, available at Wayback Machine.

== Criticisms ==
Even before the concerts, the initiative attracted criticism. Harry Belafonte, who helped organize the event, said he and actor Danny Glover were quitting in disgust because the event had "been reduced to a trade show" promoting the UN bureaucracy and Cisco.

In response criticisms regarding its finances, NetAid published a web page in November 2001 citing its record of donations to anti-poverty initiatives to date, such as granting "$1.4 million to 16 poverty alleviation projects in Kosovo and Africa — well over the $1m that had been raised from the public to that point... the remaining $10.6 million was dedicated to creating an innovative institution that will generate new support for reducing global poverty over the long term. The report said that, since January 2000, NetAid had used approximately $2 million to catalyze new support and partnerships for fighting global poverty."

== MercyCorps ==
In 2007, NetAid became a part of Mercy Corps.

== See also ==
- Benefit concert
- List of highest-grossing benefit concerts
- The Concert for Bangladesh
- Live Aid
- Live 8
- NetDay
- Swedish Metal Aid
- Virtual volunteering
