= Points of Light =

American non-profit organization

- Founded: 1990; 36 years ago Washington, D.C., U.S.
- Type: Charitable organization
- Location: Atlanta, Georgia, U.S.
- Key people: George H. W. Bush (founder); Michelle Nunn (former CEO); Tracy Hoover (former CEO); Natalye Paquin (CEO)
- Website: www.pointsoflight.org

Points of Light presentation in the East Room of the White House in January 1993

Points of Light is an international nonprofit, nonpartisan organization headquartered in Georgia, United States, dedicated to engaging more people and resources in solving serious social problems through voluntary service.

Each year, Points of Light mobilizes millions of people through affiliates in approximately 250 cities and partnerships with thousands of nonprofits and companies.

== History ==
Points of Light was formed in 2007 by the merger of the Points of Light Foundation and Hands On Network. Encouraged by major donors and affiliates, the two organizations merged with the goal of strengthening volunteerism, streamlining costs and services and deepening impact.

The Points of Light Foundation was created in 1990 as a nonprofit organization in Washington, D.C. to promote the spirit of volunteerism described by U.S. President George H. W. Bush in his 1989 inaugural address, "I have spoken of a thousand points of light, of all the community organizations that are spread like stars throughout the Nation, doing good."

President Bush used the "thousand points of light" theme frequently, including in his 1991 State of the Union address in which he said:

We have within our reach the promise of a renewed America. We can find meaning and reward by serving some higher purpose than ourselves, a shining purpose, the illumination of a Thousand Points of Light. And it is expressed by all who know the irresistible force of a child's hand, of a friend who stands by you and stays there, a volunteer's generous gesture, an idea that is simply right.

In 1991 the National Volunteer Center, which had begun in 1970 as the National Center for Voluntary Action, was merged into it. The merged organization also became known during the 2000s as the Points of Light Foundation and Volunteer Center National Network.

The Foundation and its expanded network acted as community hubs to connect volunteers to opportunities, work with local nonprofits and businesses to establish and improve volunteer programs, and, overall, bolster the local infrastructure for the volunteering community.

The Points of Light Foundation received an annual allocation from the Corporation for National and Community Service to manage some of that agency's programs, and administered the President's Volunteer Service Award program, which was created by President George W. Bush in 2003. The group also sponsored conferences, offered training and other assistance to its network of volunteer centers, and recognized volunteers through a Daily Point of Light award.

The Points of Light Foundation was in fact not a grant-making foundation. It engaged in a variety of tasks, including managing its network of volunteer centers, engaging volunteers in disaster recovery, supporting corporate volunteer councils and more.

At the same time as the Points of Light Foundation's founding, a group of young professionals in Atlanta started a group to connect volunteers with nonprofit organizations. Michelle Nunn joined this group of co-founders as the first executive director of Hands On Atlanta in 1989. The nonprofit offered a volunteer model with flexible opportunities for people to be involved in their communities through "hands on" projects like working in a soup kitchen, food bank or building a house. When the group held its first Hands On Atlanta Day in 1992, around 2,000 people volunteered.

In 2003, Nunn moved from Hands On Atlanta to become CEO of the national Atlanta-based HandsOn Network to expand the volunteer model to cities around the world.

In 2007, the Points of Light Foundation began talks with the HandsOn Network to join forces through a merger to make one national organization with local affiliates focused on volunteering and service. They combined forces on August 11, 2007, to become the Points of Light Institute. By late 2011, it changed its name to Points of Light.

Points of Light has approximately 120 affiliates in 32 countries and partnerships with thousands of nonprofits and companies. In 2012, Points of Light mobilized 4 million volunteers in 30 million hours of service worth $635 million. Points of Light received the highest possible rating (4-stars) on Charity Navigator in 2012, 2011, and 2010.

In 2013, Nunn took a leave of absence from the CEO position to pursue an unsuccessful run for Georgia's U.S. Senate seat in 2014. In 2015, Tracy Hoover was named as CEO of Points of Light, with Nunn taking a place on the board of directors. Hoover announced in January 2017 she would step down, and Natalye Paquin replaced her in September 2017.

== Criticism ==
On January 10, 1995, the Los Angeles Times published a scathing account of the new foundation, saying "the lone remnant of the Bush initiative has the look of a wasteful, Washington-dependent operation." The article noted the foundation had received $26.6 million in federal funds and had spent $22.3 million "on glitzy promotions, consultants, salaries, travel and conferences." The article said "only 11 percent of the foundation's budget had been spent to provide grants to volunteer efforts. The foundation has fallen well short of private fund-raising goals and attracted scant scrutiny from Congress." In the article, volunteerism expert Susan J. Ellis said, "There's been tons of money wasted, just wasted ... and I don't think they can show a lot of people have volunteered."

== Daily Point of Light Award ==
President Bush created the "Daily Point of Light Award" in 1989 to recognize ordinary Americans from all walks of life taking direct and consequential voluntary action in their communities to solve serious social problems. The President focused great attention on these individuals and organizations, both to honor them for their work and to call the nation to join them and multiply their efforts. The first Point of Light was awarded to The Commercial Appeal, a newspaper in Memphis, Tennessee, on November 22, 1989. By the end of his administration, President Bush had recognized 1,020 Daily Points of Light representing all fifty states and addressing issues ranging from care for infants and teenagers with AIDS to adult illiteracy and from gang violence to job training for homeless people.

President Bush devoted attention to voluntary service as a means of solving some of America's most serious social problems. In The Points of Light Movement: The President's Report to the Nation, President Bush wrote,

Points of Light are the soul of America. They are ordinary people who reach beyond themselves to touch the lives of those in need, bringing hope and opportunity, care and friendship. By giving so generously of themselves, these remarkable individuals show us not only what is best in our heritage but what all of us are called to become.

The Daily Point of Light program was not continued by President Bill Clinton upon taking office in 1993. However, with Clinton's support, Bush and the Points of Light Foundation revived the program on January 1, 1998. The Daily Point of Light has continued to be awarded by Points of Light ever since; up until his death, President Bush continued to sign all of the awards.

On July 15, 2013, President Barack Obama welcomed President Bush to the White House to celebrate the 5,000th Daily Point of Light Award. They bestowed the award on Floyd Hammer and Kathy Hamilton of Union, Iowa, for their work founding Outreach, a nonprofit that delivers free meals to hungry children in 15 countries.

Daily Point of Light honorees include:

- Israel Idonije, for his foundation's work providing support to thousands of kids through after-school programs, sports camps and medical missions in West Africa, Winnipeg and Chicago.
- Joseph Hanna, founder of Bunkers in Baghdad, for his work to collect and ship new and used golf equipment to soldiers around the world and to wounded warriors in the U.S.
- The Volunteer Partners of Sacred Heart Hospital for their support of their hospital colleagues to provide excellent patient care.
- Project Linus for their mission to embrace fragile children with hope and healing through the gift of a handmade blanket.
- Bryant Ranch Elementary School's "Once Upon A River" Project to restore the native habitat of the Santa Ana River.
- Derrius Quarles who founded Million Dollar Scholar to help high school students find scholarships
- Sikander ‘Sonny’ Khan who founded Paani Project

=== United Kingdom and Commonwealth Points of Light ===
In the United Kingdom a daily Points of Light programme recognising outstanding individual volunteers was developed in partnership with the US programme and launched by Prime Minister David Cameron at 10 Downing Street in April 2014. The awards continued under Prime Ministers Theresa May, Boris Johnson and Rishi Sunak with 2,327 individuals across the UK recognised. The most recent award was given by Sunak on 23 May 2024.

A Commonwealth Points of Light award series was launched in February 2018 as a continuation of the UK Prime Minister's Points of Light programme to coincide with the UK hosting the Commonwealth Heads of Government Meeting in London, April 2018.

== Programs ==
The organization manages a number of notable programs including

- the HandsOn Network, which leads approximately 250 volunteer action centers;
- GenerationOn, which helps schools, children and families volunteer in their communities;
- Community Blueprint, which works with nonprofits to meet the needs of veterans and military families;
- Billion + Change, which organizes companies to pledge billions of dollars in skills-based volunteer services to nonprofits;
- Civic Accelerator, which invests in civic enterprise start-ups.
- All for Good, a digital hub for volunteerism and community engagement

The Extra Mile – Points of Light Volunteer Pathway honors famous volunteers with a series of bronze medallions that form a one-mile walking path, just blocks from the White House in Washington, D.C. There are 33 people recognized, including Booker T. Washington, Jane Addams, John Muir, Clara Barton and Martin Luther King Jr.

National Volunteer Week is an annual event designed to thank volunteers for their service and encourage others across the United States to volunteer.

The HandsOn Network works in partnership with local organizations and schools to create "hands on" service projects that produce tangible benefits in communities. The network enlists a corps of hundreds of thousands of volunteers who join forces to address community needs worldwide. The HandsOn Network enables them to choose from a variety of projects that connect community needs with their time and interests. They cultivate and train volunteers to in turn lead other volunteers.

In 2018, Points of Light worked with Starbucks on a new program. 36 Starbucks employees were selected as Starbucks Service Fellows. For six months, the Fellows worked at least 20 hours per week at Starbucks, and up to 20 hours for a local organization. The program supported employees who wanted to give back to the local community. Points of Light paid the Fellows using a grant from the Starbucks Foundation, which also provided money for the local nonprofits' programs.

== Events ==
=== All Together Now: A Celebration of Service ===
Points of Light paid tribute to President George H. W. Bush and volunteer service on March 21, 2011, at the Kennedy Center in Washington, D.C. Presidents Jimmy Carter, Bill Clinton, and George W. Bush joined President George H.W. Bush to highlight the role volunteer service plays in people's lives. It marked the first time all four former presidents had come together since President Barack Obama's inauguration in January 2009. President Obama was on a trip to South America and taped a video message for the event. The Tribute to the elder Bush — called "All Together Now: A Celebration of Service" — featured singers Carrie Underwood, Darius Rucker, and Garth Brooks, and broadcaster Jim Nantz.

=== Presidential Forum on Service ===
On October 16, 2009, President Obama held a Presidential Forum on Service hosted by former President George H.W. Bush and Points of Light at the George Bush Presidential Library Center on the campus of Texas A&M University. The event celebrated the contributions of more than 4,500 Daily Point of Light award winners and honored President Bush's legacy of service and civic engagement.

At the Presidential Forum, President Obama said,

Government can build the best schools, with the best teachers – but we can't run the PTA, or chaperone those field trips, or mentor those kids after school, or have them sit down and do their homework at night. We can pass the most comprehensive health reform bill – but Congress can't be on the ground in our communities caring for the sick and helping people lead healthier lives. Government can give our troops the equipment they need, and the pay and benefits that they have earned, and nobody is working harder at doing that than Secretary Gates – but it can't be there to offer a home-cooked meal to a military family stretched thin, or to make sure our veterans get the respect and appreciation they deserve in their communities when they come home.

In the end, when it comes to the challenges we face, the need for action always exceeds the limits of government. While there's plenty that government can do and must do to keep our families safe, and our planet clean, and our markets free and fair, there's a lot that government can't – and shouldn't – do. And that's where active, engaged citizens come in. That's the purpose of service in this nation.

And that's the point I want to emphasize today: that service isn't separate from our national priorities, or secondary to our national priorities – it's integral to achieving our national priorities. It's how we will meet the challenges of our time.

=== Conference on Volunteering and Service ===
Since 1992, leaders from the nonprofit, for-profit, government, Hollywood and military sectors have gathered for Points of Light's annual Conference on Volunteering and Service. In 2012, approximately 5,000 people attended a plenary session featuring former First Lady Barbara Bush, Second Lady Jill Biden, Points of Light CEO Michelle Nunn and actor Kevin Bacon.

=== Make a Difference Day ===
Make A Difference Day is the nation's largest day of service, created by USA Weekend magazine and held in partnership with Points of Light on the fourth Saturday of each October. An estimated 3 million volunteers spent the 22nd Make A Difference Day in 2012 helping their communities in projects ranging from bowl-a-thon fundraisers to beach cleanups.

=== Martin Luther King Jr. Day ===
Each year, on Martin Luther King Jr. Day, Points of Light honors King's memory with service projects across the United States, calling it their MLK Day of service. In 2013, Vice President Joe Biden and his family joined 10,000 volunteers at Points of Light's service project at the D.C. Armory to put together 100,000 thank-you "care kits" for U.S. military personnel, disabled veterans, and civilian first responders.

=== International Year of Volunteers ===
In the US, the Points of Light Foundation and the Association of Junior Leagues International (AJLI) partnered to convene and lead the International Year of Volunteers 2001 USA Steering Committee. Members of the committee included the National Council of Volunteer Centers, National Council on Workplace Volunteering, Association for Volunteer Administration, National Parents and Teachers Association and Make A Difference Day. The USA's IYV web site, www.iyv2001us.org, was launched in September 2000.

== Awards ==
Points of Light Foundation & HandsOn Network received a Fast Company Social Capitalist Award in 2008.

== See also ==
- Association for Leaders in Volunteer Engagement (ALIVE)
- Office of Social Innovation and Civic Participation (USA)
- European Volunteer Centre (CEV)
