= Association for Volunteer Administration =

Association for Volunteer Administration (formerly American Association of Volunteer Services Coordinators)
- Formation: 1961
- Type: Professional association
- Headquarters: Alexandria, Virginia
- Members: approximately 2,100
- Official language: English
- Website: www.avaintl.org (1998 - 2006)

The Association for Volunteer Administration (AVA) was created in 1961 as a nonprofit association for those that work with volunteers, in any setting. For more than 44 years, it was the largest professional association in the world for managers of volunteers. AVA hosted an annual conference in cities around the USA, a certification program for managers of volunteers, an online community and The Journal of Volunteer Administration (JOVA), and recognized outstanding managers of volunteers with a special award each year. AVA was dissolved in 2006 amid allegations of financial mismanagement by employees, the dismissal of three employees, including the executive director, the accumulation of more than $250,000 in debt, and lack of adequate financial and administrative oversight by the board of directors.

== History ==
The organization had existed since its formal charter in 1961 as "The American Association of Volunteer Services Coordinators" (AAVSC). It adopted its name, Association for Volunteer Administration, or AVA, in 1979. At the time of its dissolution, the mission of AVA was to "advance volunteerism and enhance quality of life locally and globally by engaging leaders of volunteers through professional development, networking, and quality products and services." AVA members were engaged in the management of volunteers in nonprofit, governmental, school-based, and similar mission-based settings. As of January 1, 2006, AVA had approximately 2,100 paid members, with approximately 90% from the United States, 10% from Canada, and a few from other nations, and was governed by a 16-member board of directors.

== Programs ==
AVA programs and services included the Certified Volunteer Manager (CVM) certification program, The Journal of Volunteer Administration (JOVA), member briefings and newsletters, the CyberVPM online discussion group on Yahoo! Groups, and Volunteer Management magazine. AVA also organized the annual International Conference on Volunteer Administration (ICVA), as both a training and networking event for those that work with volunteers.

AVA also created the Harriet Naylor Distinguished Member Service Award, which was given annually from 1981 through 2004. The award was named for a national director of the Office of Volunteer Development at what was then the USA Department of Health, Education and Welfare in the 1970s, who "used her visibility to be an advocate for volunteers and for leaders of volunteers. The award was presented to an active AVA member "who has made an outstanding contribution to the association. Recipients of the award are recognized for their support of AVA through leadership positions, special projects, research, publications, advocacy and other activities that have strengthened both the association and the profession of volunteer resources management." The list and requirements are archived at the Internet Archive.

AVA launched a web site in 1998, using the URL www.avaintl.org. Public pages of the web site from February 2001 through May 2005 are archived at the Internet Archive.

In association with the International Year of Volunteers 2001 as declared by the United Nations, AVA drafted the "Universal Declaration On Leading And Managing Volunteers".

== Demise ==
The organization had no permanent executive director for most of 2004. At the 2004 ICVA in Portland, Oregon, the AVA board of directors, led by board president Nancy Gaston, appointed John Throop as executive director, to assume duties on 1 January 2005. The AVA web site as of May 21, 2005 stated he had previously facilitated the AVA board's visioning and re-positioning project, and that he was ordained and practicing Episcopal priest.

An article in the Chronicle of Philanthropy quoted two board members who said AVA was in "good financial health" until after the 2005 conference in Jacksonville, Florida, when an audit showed that AVA had gone into debt. In mid-January, 2006, the AVA Executive Committee met in Minneapolis, Minnesota to discuss the sustainability of AVA and how to best handle contracts that it said were signed without board approval for the 2006 ICVA. The board concluded that plans could not move forward for a conference in 2006. On February 3 the board, staff, and pro bono attorneys met via teleconference to discuss options for the future of AVA, including bankruptcy and dissolution.

On February 23 and again on February 27, 2006, Ellen Didimamoff, who had become President of AVA the previous November, wrote to the AVA membership to say that AVA was in the process of closing its doors on March 1, 2006 "because there are no funds to continue operating." In her letter, she characterized the demise of AVA:

Starting in June 2005 the board persistently asked about the financial status of the organization. The board never really was given a true picture of AVA's financial situation until January 2006 when it learned that AVA was $300,000 in debt. Our auditors informed the Executive Committee that too much money was spent on salaries and Executive Director travel and that ICVA expenses were unusually high.

She continued:

The board also learned that assets were mismanaged, and signatures on AVA's money market and checking accounts were changed without the board's knowledge. Large sums of money were transferred from AVA's money market account to its checking account in December, and then the money was spent. Unauthorized contracts for future conferences were made. Delving deeper, AVA found other signs of mismanagement, misappropriation of restricted funds and abusive, unauthorized spending. The Executive Committee voted to terminate three employees on January 10, including the Executive Director and Office Manager. The Henrico County Police Department is investigating possible criminal charges.

The police unit that oversees Richmond conducted a criminal inquiry and in March concluded that no criminal activity had occurred. The organization folded with $259,000 in debt.

The AVA board gave permission for long-time CVA manager Katie Campbell to form a nonprofit to take ownership of the copyrighted CVA curriculum and to continue to offer the curriculum and certify students of such. The nonprofit, the Council for Certification in Volunteer Administration (CCVA), continues to host the Certified in Volunteer Administration (CVA) program. CVA also manages the CAVS (Certified Administrator of Volunteer Services) certification, a program especially for leaders of volunteers in healthcare settings, sponsored by the Association for Healthcare Volunteer Resource Professionals.

JOVA was given to R. Dale Safrit at North Carolina State University, specifically the Department of 4-H Youth Development in the College of Agriculture and Life Sciences, and renamed The International Journal of Volunteer Administration (IJOVA).

AVA had purchased an online discussion group, CyberVPM, from an individual who started the group. Per the demise of AVA, the group's control and ownership was given to a volunteer, Meghan Kaskoun. The group was active until March 2016.

Debate among managers of volunteers regarding the demise of AVA was debated in the comments section of the March 2006 "Hot Topic" at Energize, Inc. and on CyberVPM, with several AVA members blaming board mismanagement and poor oversight for creating the conditions that allowed for the problems that led to AVA's demise.

== Aftermath ==
In response to the dissolution of the Association of Volunteer Administrators (AVA), the Points of Light Foundation & Volunteer Center National Network hosted two conference calls on March 28 and April 19, 2006. The calls provided an opportunity to discuss current and anticipated needs of volunteer resource managers and possible next steps to support AVA's former members. A total of nearly 100 volunteer managers, representing local, state and national organizations, participated in one of the two calls.

Three movements immediately emerged to replace AVA. One was called the Congress of Volunteer Administrator Associations (COVAA). Organizers of this initiative launched a web site in 2006, www.COVAA.org. Another initiative was called the Association of Volunteer Professionals, and the associated web site was www.avppb.org, and the third initiative was www.vmweb.org. By the end of 2007, all three initiatives were abandoned, and updates were no longer made to their web sites, according to records at the Internet Archive.

In 2009, AL!VE: Association for Leaders in Volunteer Engagement was launched as a nonprofit organization. It went live with its own web site in November 2009.

The first national conference for managers of volunteers since the demise of AVA was held in July 2017, hosted by the Minnesota Association for Volunteer Administration. As volunteerism expert Susan J. Ellis noted, "It has been 10 years since we had a national event designed exclusively for people whose work centers on engaging volunteers. At one time we relied on what was the Association for Volunteer Administration (AVA) for such an annual gathering, but when AVA died, so did the conference ... This is do-or-die time for AL!VE, the Association of Leaders in Volunteer Engagement."

== See also ==
- Association of Fundraising Professionals
- Association for Research on Nonprofit Organizations and Voluntary Action (ARNOVA)
- Coaching
- Community engagement
- European Volunteer Centre (CEV)
- Human relations movement
- Human resources
- Human resource management
- International Association for Volunteer Effort (IAVE)
- International Council of Voluntary Agencies (ICVA)
- List of professional designations in the United States
- List of volunteer awards
- Mentoring
- Philanthropy in the United States
- Pro bono
- Society for Human Resource Management (SHRM)
- Talent management
- Training
- Training and development
- Volunteering
