= Mandela Day =

International day in honour of Nelson Mandela's birthday

Nelson Mandela Day
- Official name: Nelson Mandela International Day
- Date: 18 July
- Frequency: Annual
- First time: 2010; 16 years ago

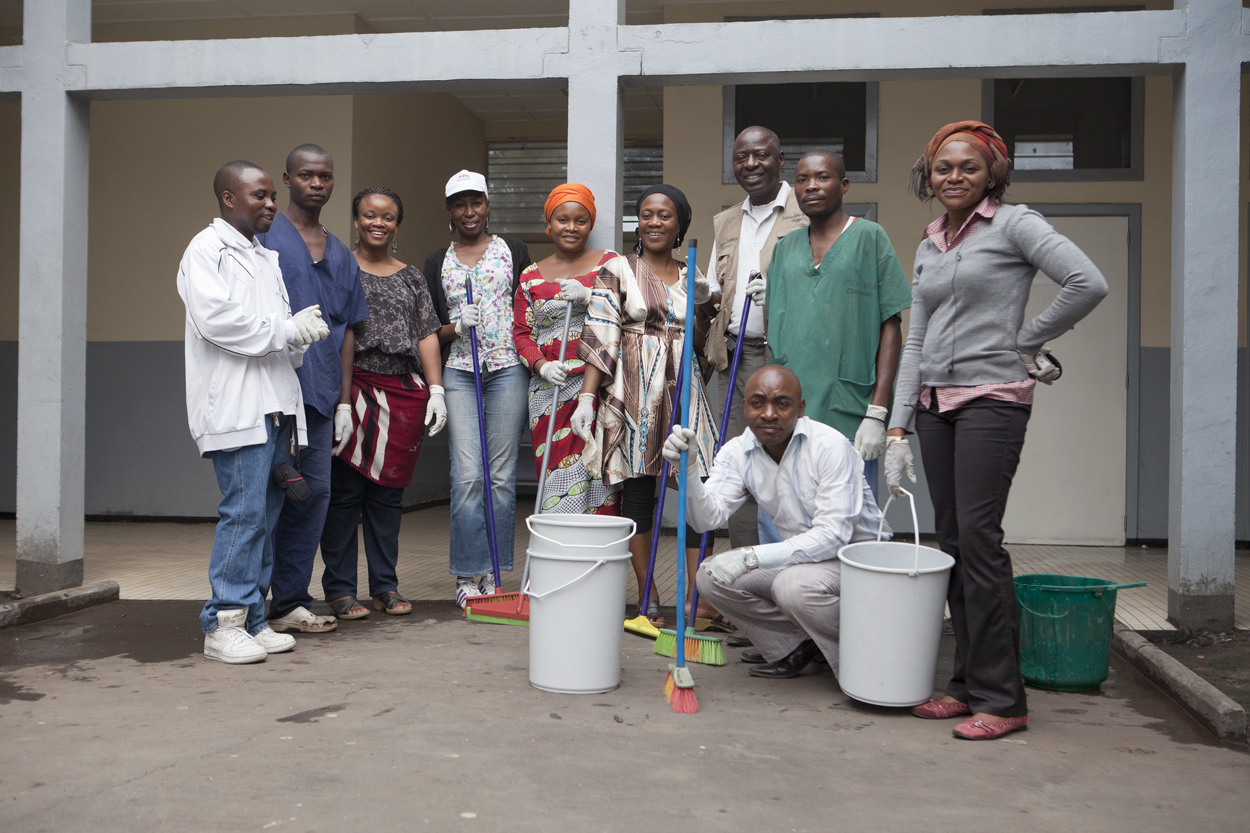
MONUSCO staff cleaning a section of Goma General Hospital in the DRC on Mandela Day 2012

Nelson Mandela International Day (or Mandela Day) is an annual international day in honour of Nelson Mandela, celebrated each year on 18 July, Mandela's birthday.

== History ==
The day was officially declared by the United Nations in November 2009, with the first UN Mandela Day held on 18 July 2010. However, other groups began celebrating Mandela Day on 18 July 2009.

On 27 April 2009, the 46664 concerts and the Nelson Mandela Foundation invited the global community to join them in support of an official Mandela Day. Mandela Day is not meant as a public holiday, but as a day to honour the legacy of Nelson Mandela, South Africa's former president, and his values, through volunteering and community service.

Mandela Day is a global call to action that celebrates the idea that each individual has the power to transform the world, the ability to make an impact.

The Mandela Day campaign message is:

"Nelson Mandela has fought for social justice for 67 years. We're asking you to start with 67 minutes."
"We would be honoured if such a day can serve to bring people together around the world to fight poverty and promote peace, reconciliation and cultural diversity," according to a statement issued on Mandela's behalf.

To mark the first global celebration of Mandela Day on 18 July 2009, Mandela's 91st birthday, a series of educational, art exhibit, fund-raising and volunteer events leading up to a concert at Radio City Music Hall on 18 July were organised by the 46664 concerts and the Nelson Mandela Foundation. In November 2009, the United Nations General Assembly formally declared 18 July to be "Nelson Mandela International Day".

== Mandela Prize ==
In 2014, the UN General Assembly established the Nelson Mandela Prize, an award given every 5 years recognising the achievements of those who dedicated their lives to the service of humanity.

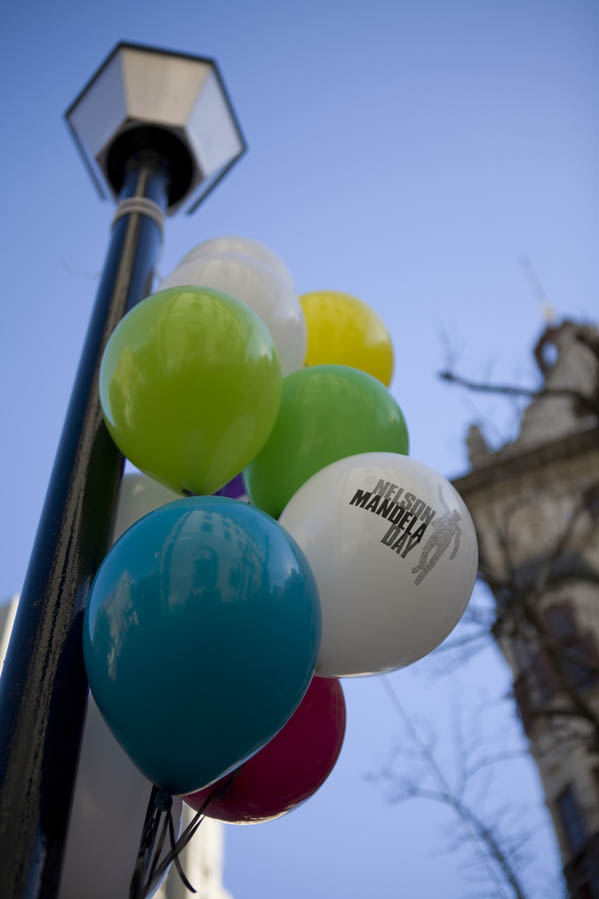

== See also ==
- Association for Volunteer Administration
- Civic Engagement
- Good Deeds Day
- International Volunteer Day
- List of volunteer awards
- Random Acts of Kindness Day
- Standard Minimum Rules for the Treatment of Prisoners
