= Association of Leaders in Volunteer Engagement =

Professional association of volunteer managers

Association for Leaders Volunteer Engagement
- Formation: 2007
- Type: Professional association
- Tax ID no.: 26-2600409
- Legal status: 501(c)(3)
- Headquarters: San Francisco, CA
- Region served: United States
- Official language: English
- Website: volunteeralive.org

The Association for Leaders Volunteer Engagement (AL!VE) was created in 2007. It is a professional association for managers of volunteers. It is a nonprofit organization.

== History ==
Following the demise of the Association for Volunteer Administration (AVA) in 2006, discussions were held during the Points of Light Conference in Seattle in June 2006 by former AVA members about what kind of new organization might serve the needs of people that work with and support volunteers. Various people at this meeting expressed interest in creating a new professional association, and created a group called the Congress of Volunteer Administration Associations (COVAA) to explore the idea. COVAA launched a web site at www.covaa.org by August 2006.

The COVAA organizers held an event in December 2006 in Denver. About 90 people attended, representing local associations of those managing volunteers, commonly called DOVIAs (directors of volunteers in agencies), from cities large and small; state associations of volunteer administrators; affinity groups such as health care settings, volunteer centers, museums, local government, and animal shelters; and networks within national organizations such as volunteer program managers at the American Red Cross and Volunteers of America. At the end of three days, a COVAA Steering Committee was elected to continue to seek involvement and input from the widest range of colleagues working with volunteers, and to explore the creation of a permanent new association to serve as a professional network for such.

A year later, based on feedback to COVAA organizers and discussions during a town hall meeting at the 2007 National Conference on Volunteering and Service in Philadelphia, the COVAA Steering Committee proposed the launch of a new professional association for people that work with volunteers, and the name of this association to be "ALIVE." It would stand for the "Association of Leaders in Volunteer Engagement." The organizers proposed the following mission ALIVE: "to enhance and sustain the spirit of volunteerism in America by fostering collaboration and networking, promoting professional development, and providing advocacy for leaders in community engagement". AL!VE received a grant from the Volunteer Impact Fund to be used as start-up funding. The Founding Board was formed at a facilitated retreat in Denver in February 2009. AL!VE went live with its own web site in November 2009.

== Programs ==
Now abbreviated as AL!VE, the association serves both professionals and volunteers that work in the management of volunteers and volunteer engagement. It advocates for the recognition and appreciation of volunteer management, and works to be a resource for and provide a link to tools, research, and best practices regarding volunteer engagement. The association has published 21 online newsletters that chronicle its activities. The association also provides a web page of web-based resources regarding the management and support of volunteers.

AL!VE participated in the first national conference for managers of volunteers since the demise of AVA in July 2017, hosted by the Minnesota Association for Volunteer Administration. As volunteerism expert Susan J. Ellis noted, "It has been 10 years since we had a national event designed exclusively for people whose work centers on engaging volunteers. At one time we relied on what was the Association for Volunteer Administration (AVA) for such an annual gathering, but when AVA died, so did the conference... This is do-or-die time for AL!VE, the Association of Leaders in Volunteer Engagement."

== See also ==
- Community engagement
- European Volunteer Centre (CEV)
- Human relations movement
- Human resources
- Human resource management
- List of professional designations in the United States
- List of volunteer awards
- Philanthropy in the United States
- Pro bono
- Society for Human Resource Management (SHRM)
- Talent management
- Volunteering
