= International Council for Voluntary Agencies =

Group of humanitarian organisations, based in Geneva

International Council of Voluntary Agencies
- Conseil International des Agences Bénévoles
- Predecessor: The Conference on Non-Governmental Organizations interested in Migration, The International Committee for World Refugee Year, The Standing Conference for Voluntary Agencies Working for Refugees.
- Formation: 1962
- Headquarters: Geneva
- Executive Director: Dr. Jamie Munn
- Website: https://www.icvanetwork.org/

International Council for Voluntary Agencies is a Switzerland-based global network of humanitarian organisations working on migration and refugee issues. It won the Nansen Refugee Award in 1963.

== Organisation ==
The International Council for Voluntary Agencies is based in Geneva and often known by its French name Conseil international des Agences bénévoles.

== History ==
The International Council for Voluntary Agencies a global network of not for profit organisations that work on refugee and forcible displacement issues. It was founded in 1962 to succeed the Conference on Non-Governmental Organizations interested in Migration, the International Committee for World Refugee Year, and the Standing Conference for Voluntary Agencies Working for Refugees. The work of the organisation, as of 1966, was directed by The Commission on Refugees and The Commission on Migration and The Commission on Social and Economic Development.

The organisation was awarded the Nansen Refugee Award in 1963; the award was accepted by Mr. C. Ritchie. Thomas Getman was the Executive Director in 2006, Nan Buzard was the Executive Director in 2016, Ignacio Packer was the Executive Director in 2022.

== See also ==
- United Nations High Commissioner for Refugees
