= European Volunteer Centre =

The Centre for European Volunteering (Centre Européen du Volontariat)
- Abbreviation: CEV
- Formation: 1992
- Headquarters: Avenue des Arts 7/8 Brussels, Belgium
- Official language: English, French
- President: Lejla Šehić Relić
- Key people: Gabriella Civico (director)
- Website: www.europeanvolunteercentre.org

The Centre for European Volunteering (CEV) (until 1 July 2020 known as the European Volunteer Centre), established in 1992, is the European network of over 60 organisations dedicated to the promotion of, and support to, volunteers and volunteering in Europe at European, national or regional level. Through the network, CEV works to achieve four strategic priorities: the value of quality volunteering as an expression of Solidarity and European values is understood, supported and celebrated; Policies & programmes, together with the European social environment, inspires, encourages and supports quality European Volunteering; Individuals and organisations that are active in the volunteering and civil society sphere share, learn and are inspired from one another in the framework of CEV; CEV is a well-run and effective organisation. In this way CEV reaches out to the many thousands of volunteers and volunteer organisations in Europe as a source of support in bringing the European dimension to their work and strengthen links between them.

== History ==
CEV's origins lie in an initiative by 6 volunteer centres, Association pour le Volontariat (Belgium), Centre National du Volontariat (France), the National Centre for Volunteering (UK), Centro Nazionale per il Volontariato (Italy), Landelijk Steunpunt Vrijwilligerswerk (Netherlands) and Plataforma para la Promoción del Voluntariado en España (Spain). These organisations convened at a meeting organised in Lucca, Italy, in 1989, for the representatives of National and Regional Volunteer Centres from seven European countries. The outcome of the meeting was a joint declaration for increased European cooperation.

CEV was founded in February 1990 on the basis of this declaration and in 1992 was officially granted the status of “international non-profit organisation" registered under Belgian law. The Vlaams Steunpunt Vrijwilligerswerk, Flemish Volunteer Centre, was granted the responsibility to put in place the new organisation. On 5 December 1995, CEV organised the first ever "European Day for Volunteering in the European Parliament", Brussels, Belgium, with the active support of the European Parliament, the European Commission, the Council of the European Union and UNESCO.

Between 1994 and 2002 CEV administered as Technical Assistance Office over 13 contracts of the European Commission's PHARE and TACIS-LIEN Programme in Central and Eastern Europe and the Commonwealth of Independent States (CIS) and released a series of publications within these programmes.

As of July 1, 2020, the CEV went through a process of rebranding. This rebranding consisted of changing the English name of CEV from “European Volunteer Centre” to “Centre for European Volunteering” in order to align the name with the already used acronym “CEV”, which was taken from the French name for the organisation “Centre Européen du Volontariat”. The rebranding also introduced a new logo and visual identity for the organisation, which was first used during the candidacy application stage for the European Volunteering Capital 2022.

On its 25th anniversary in 2017 CEV published a timeline of volunteering in Europe.

In 2024 CEV published a new updated timeline of volunteering in Europe.

== Member organisations ==
CEV full members are national and regional support centres for volunteering and organisations exercising the role of a national or regional support centre for volunteering in European countries. Full members must be not-for profit and non-governmental organisations.

Associate members are volunteers involving organisations or organisations that promote and develop volunteering in a specialised field or a specific type of volunteering. Associate members act on local, regional, national or international level.

== Organisation ==
CEV is supported in its work by a Board and by a Secretariat team based in Brussels.

=== Presidents ===
Name	Term
Ms Lejla Šehić Relić	2023-present
Ms Lejla Šehić Relić	2019–2023
Ms Cristina Rigman	2016–2019
Ms Eva Hambach	2009– 2015
Dr Marijke Steenbergen	2007–2009
Mr Christopher Spence	2002–2007
Ms Liz Burns	1997–2001
Ms Monique Verstraeten	1992–1997

=== Directors ===
Name	Term
Ms Gabriella Civico	2012–present
Mr Martijn Pakker	2011-2012
Mr Markus Held	2004–2011
Ms Gail Hurley	2002–2004
Mr Raf De Zutter	1994–2002

== Partnership and collaboration ==
Partnership with CEV is open to any stakeholder that is willing to support CEV and its mission to contribute to the creation of an enabling political, social and economic environment for volunteering in Europe and where the full potential of volunteering can be realised.

Whilst a network itself CEV is also actively involved at European level and in international networks. CEV is a member of: EESC Liaison Group for European Civil Society, Europass Advisory Group, European Qualifications Framework Advisory Group, DG EMPL Civil Dialogue Group, ESC Resource Centre Advisory Group, The Conference of INGOs of the Council of Europe, Civil Society Europe, Erasmus+ Coalition and SDG Watch Europe.

== Strategic objectives ==
- The value of quality volunteering as an expression of Solidarity and European values is understood, supported and celebrated

- Policies & programmes, together with the European social environment, inspires, encourages and supports quality European Volunteering

- Individuals and organisations that are active in the volunteering and civil society sphere share, learn and are inspired from one another in the framework of CEV

- CEV is a well-run and effective organisation

== Current activities ==
=== European Volunteering Capital Competition - #EVCapital ===
In 2013 European Year of Citizens, CEV launched the European Volunteering Capital Competition. This initiative aims to promote volunteering at the local level by giving recognition to municipalities that support and strengthen partnerships with volunteer centres and volunteer involving organisations and celebrate and promote volunteering and the impact made by volunteers. The story so far: Barcelona EVCapital 2014, Lisbon EVCapital 2015, London EVCapital 2016, Sligo EVCapital 2017, Aarhus EVCapital 2018, Košice EVCapital 2019, Padova EVCapital 2020, Berlin EVCapital 2021, Gdansk EVCapital 2022, Trondheim EVCapital 2023, Trento EVCapital 2024, Mechelen EVCapital 2025.

=== Employee Volunteering European Network (EVEN) ===
EVEN was established by the Centre for European Volunteering (CEV) in 2013 together with founding members: Telefonica Fundación, Intel and Voluntarios de “la Caixa”. This initiative aims to increase the number of employers and volunteer-involving organisations with the capacity and willingness to implement good quality employee volunteering and give greater visibility to these initiatives.

Employee Volunteering European Network (EVEN) main objectives are:

- Increase the numbers of employers and volunteer-involving organisations with the capacity and willingness to implement good quality employee volunteering,
- Give recognition and credibility to entities from all sectors that are able to implement good quality employee volunteering projects,
- Share experiences and new developments and have access to reliable and competent partners for employee volunteering,

Enable increased competences in employee volunteering through EVEN training materials, Reports from various EVEN activities are available its website.

The CEV-EVEN Workbooks a toolkits to help volunteer-involving organisations and employers to develop employee volunteering, (in EN & translations) can be downloaded from its website.

=== Projects ===
CEV is a partner in the following projects working towards a better recognition of volunteering: REVIVE Project, MARVI Project, REAL Project, SPACE Project, VIEWS Project, ILIVE Project, SLIPS Project, UVMIS Project, TEAM Project, EQVAL Project, Slipstream Project. Read more about CEV's projects here:

=== CEV News ===
"CEV News" is a monthly newsletter providing information on CEV activities, CEV members' projects, EU policies and relevant calls for proposals, events and any other relevant information for volunteer stakeholders within the CEV membership and beyond.

=== Publications and reports ===
CEV serves as a knowledge and research resource for volunteering, funding opportunities and practice in Europe. CEV regularly publishes documents including conference conclusions, annual reports and other policy statements. Wider selection of published research and resources in relation to volunteering can be found on its website.

== Past activities ==
- To promote volunteering to the general public, the media, businesses and policy-makers (e.g. through active participation in the Europe for Citizens Forum and the 2nd EU Civil Protection Forum, Contribution to a Council recommendation on mobility of young volunteers across Europe);
- To win recognition for the role and value of volunteering as an expression of active citizenship in Europe (e.g. Manifesto for Volunteering in Europe, 2006; INVOLVE Project; MOVE Project Participatory Status of Council of Europe);
- To gather and provide information on developments within the EU on volunteer related topics (e.g. Research on the Legal Status of Volunteers in Europe in collaboration with AVSO, Facts&Figures on Volunteering);
- To represent the needs and concerns of CEV members within EU policy and with international institutions (e.g. European Election Manifesto, 2009; Public Hearing on the European Year of Volunteering 2011 in the European Parliament);
- To promote the role of volunteer development centres in advancing volunteering as an expression of active citizenship (e.g. V::I::P project; Think Future Volunteer Together project);
- To conduct research on volunteering (e.g. Bibliography on Volunteering Research in Europe; the VALUE Project);
- To encourage networking between organisations and to facilitate the exchange of good practice and innovation (e.g. CEV General Assembly in Prague on Employee Volunteering with Partnership Fair; the CEV Multi-Stakeholder Forum in April 2010);
- To provide a forum for our members to find partners for European-wide projects;
- To develop strategic alliances with other key networks and organisations (e.g. the European Year of Volunteering 2011 Alliance);
- Biannual General Assemblies, conferences, seminars, workshops and meetings;
- CEV News (CEV's monthly electronic news bulletin);
- An interactive CEV Website;
- Online communication tools: Facebook, Online Community, and YouTube channel;
- In 2012 CEV celebrated 20 years of being the voice of volunteering in Europe!
- In 2021 CEV published the Blueprint for European Volunteering #BEV2030 that serves as guidance to CEV and other stakeholders concerned with volunteering, especially policymakers, regarding the steps that need to be taken for volunteering to reach its true potential.
- In 2022 CEV celebrated 30 years of being the voice of volunteering in Europe!
- In 2023 CEV launched the Vote Volunteer Vision Campaign requesting the new MEPs for the 2024-2029 European Parliament to put volunteering in their political agenda.

== Events ==
=== Policy conferences ===
CEV General Assemblies and Conferences:

2025, Mechelen, Belgium

2024, Brussels, Belgium

2024 - Trento, Italy

2023 - Dubrovnik, Croatia

2023 - Brussels, Belgium

2022 - Gdansk, Poland

2022 - Brussels, Belgium

2021 - Berlin, Germany

2021 - Brussels, Belgium

2020 - Online due to the COVID-19 Pandemic, however originally intended to be in Padova, Italy

2020 - Online due to the COVID-19 Pandemic, however originally intended to be in Galway, Ireland.

2019 - Brussels, Belgium

2019 - Budapest, Hungary

2018 - Brussels, Belgium

2018 - Rijeka, Croatia

2017 - Vienna, Austria

2017 - London, UK

2016 - Brussels, Belgium

2016 - Bucharest, Romania

2015 Brussels, Belgium

2015 - Zadar, Croatia

2014 - Turin, Italy

2014 - Brussels, Belgium

2013 - Sarajevo, Bosnia and Herzegovina

2013 - Dublin, Ireland

2012 - Portugal

2012 - Copenhagen, Denmark

2011- Berlin, Germany

2011 - Tallinn, Estonia

2010 - Brussels, Belgium

2010 - Valencia, Spain

=== CEV Study Visits ===
CEV hosts annual Study visits, often inviting participants from various member organisations into Brussels and offering the chance to experience the work CEV does first hand. These visits allow participants to become more informed on volunteering policies, programmes and practices within the context of the EU and European Union institutions. Participants, accompanied by CEV staff, have the chance to visit the main European Institution, to connect with EU Officials and MEPs, as well as get in contact with the representatives of civil society organisations. They are also introduced to CEV's activities and engagement in promoting volunteering across Europe.

Previous study visits have invited participants from Volunteering England (UK), ProVobis (Romania), Volunteer Centres Ireland (Ireland), La Plateforme Francophone du Volontariat (Belgium) and participants from Italian CSVnet (Coordinamento Nazionale dei Centri di Servizio per il Volontariato) member organisations (CSVs) located in different regions.

==== Seminars ====
CEV also frequently hosts and contributes to various seminars, conferences, and policy discussion roundtables in order to share best practices, information and research on volunteering, and to represent the volunteer sector in EU policy consultations.

Some of these seminars in recent years have included:

-5 March 2024: Empowering Social Inclusion: The Crucial Role of the Validation of non-formal and informal learning and personal development (Workshop, CSW2024)

-4 March 2024: Success factors for e-democracy participatory initiatives (Workshop, CSW2024)

-25 September 2023: VERA - Training on engaging people with disabilities as volunteers in Padova

-21 June 2023: REACT Storytelling Faces and Voices Webinar

-21 March 2023: Launch of CEV Vote Volunteer Vision Campaign 2024, European Year of Volunteers 2025 & Platform for Older People Volunteering updates

-20 March 2023: #REACT - "Rights & Equality - Active Citizens Together" - Blueprint for European Volunteering 2030 Seminar

-25 October 2022: CEV Thematic Workshop on "EU Volunteering: how do we build inclusive communities?" at the FEPS ANNUAL AUTUMN ACADEMY 2022 “For a Youthful European Future”

-4 July 2022: INEAR Webinar, Resources for more value (Online)

-29 June 2022: Volunteering Interest Group in the EP (Brussels, Belgium)

-22 June 2022: INEAR Webinar, Appreciation of contribution (Online)

-30 May 2022: INEAR Webinar, Empowerment

-27 April 2022: INEAR Webinar, New volunteers and methods, (Online)

-16 March 2022: Civil Society Days 2022 CEV Workshop 3 "Volunteers for Prosperity" (Brussels&Online)

-21-23 January 2022: Conference on the Future of Europe Plenary (Strasbourg)

-14 September 2021: CEV Conference “Revealing European Values in Volunteer Events” (REVIVE)

-14 April 2021: Volunteering Interest Group in the European Parliament. (Online)

-23 February 2021: SDG Watch Europe - Annual General Assembly (Online)

-10 February 2021: CEV Webinar: Lights, Camera, Action: Communicating on Volunteering & Solidarity in the digital age (CEV Members only!)

-24 July 2020: Webinar: Volunteering in Post COVID-19 Crisis: What now?

-19 June 2020: Webinar: Volunteering in events and how to keep solidarity at the heart of it

-15 April 2020: European Solidarity Corps Stakeholder meeting (Online)

-19 February 2020: SDG Watch Europe General Assembly

-30 January 2020: Volunteering Interest Group in the European Parliament

-8 October 2019 : 'Solidarity and Volunteering - European Rights and Values from the bottom up', European Volunteering Capital Seminar during EU Regions

-21 November 2019: European Conference - Impact and lessons of ESC - Legal status, traditions and cultures of Volunteering and Solidarity in Europe, Brussels (Belgium)

-9-20 April 2018 - Volunteering in Culture, Rijeka (Croatia)

-April 2017 - Developing European Volunteering Strategies, London (UK)

-April 2016 - The Volunteer Manager: Key for Excellency in Volunteer Management, Bucharest (Romania)

== See also ==
- Association for Leaders in Volunteer Engagement (ALIVE)
- Points of Light
