= List of alumni of Nottingham Trent University =

This is a list of notable alumni of Nottingham Trent University and its predecessor institutions.

This is a dynamic list and may never be able to satisfy particular standards for completeness. You can help by expanding it with reliably sourced entries.

== Notable alumni ==
=== Politics and public service ===
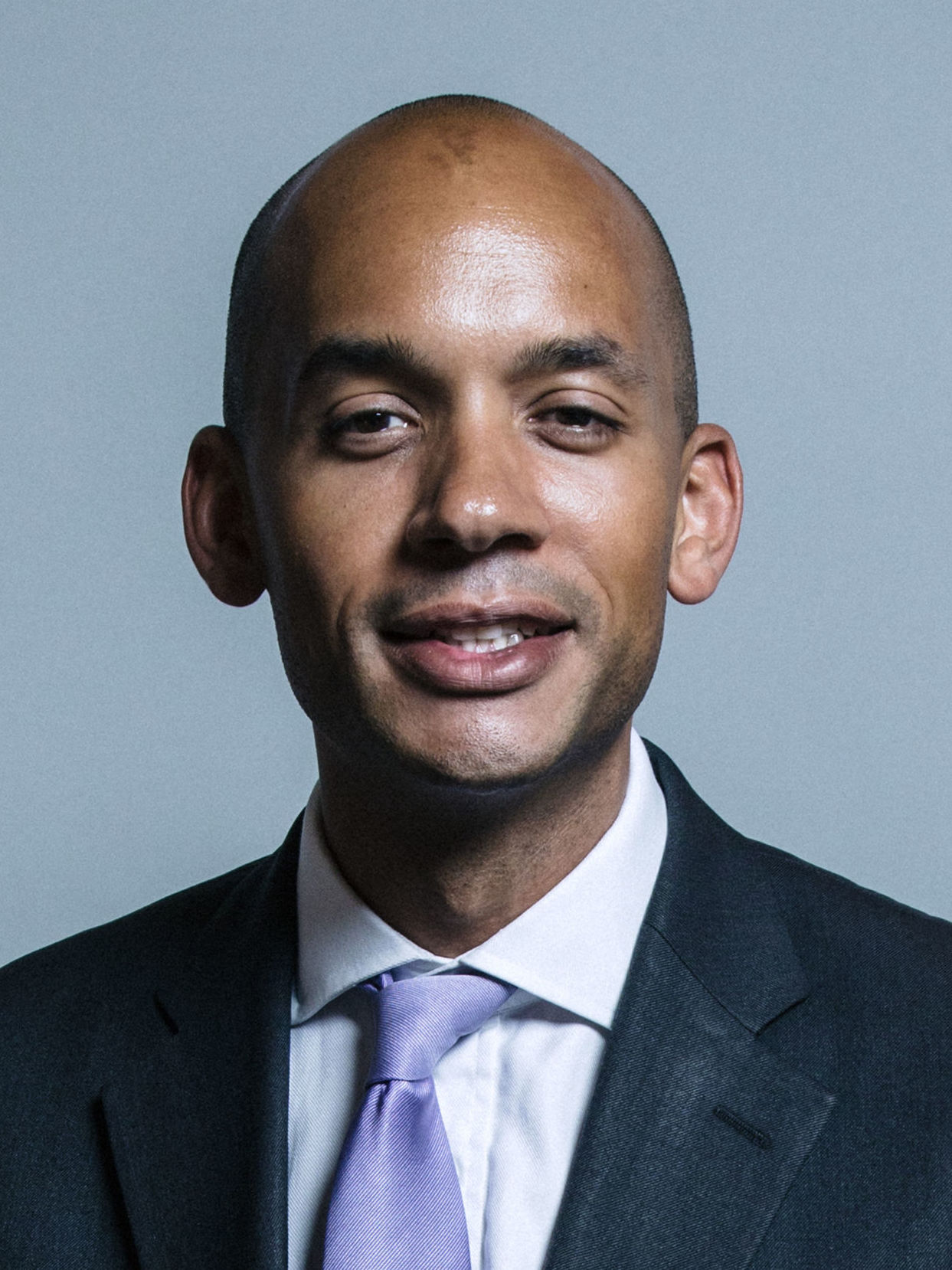
Chuka Umunna, Labour Party politician

- Hazel Blears – British Labour Party politician and former Cabinet Minister.
- Ben Bradley – Conservative MP for Mansfield.
- Duncan Baker – Conservative MP for North Norfolk.
- Vernon Coaker – Labour MP for Gedling (1997–2019).
- Liz Blackman – British Labour Party politician.
- Brendan Clarke-Smith – Conservative Party politician.
- Matthew Offord – Conservative Party politician.
- Alan Simpson – Labour MP for Nottingham South (1992–2010).
- Glenis Willmott – Former leader of the European Parliamentary Labour Party.
- Alyn Smith – Scottish politician.
- Anne Marie Waters – British political activist.
- Martyn Jones – Former Labour MP.
- Mark Simmonds – Former MP for Boston and Skegness.
- Chuka Umunna – MP for Streatham (2010–2019).
- Nene Amegatcher – Justice of the Supreme Court of Ghana (2018–2023).
- JoBeth Coleby-Davis – Bahamian politician and attorney.
- Chris Lee Chun Kit – Malaysian politician.
- Malik Noor Saleem Khan – Pakistani politician.
- Mohammed bin Jasim Alghatam – Bahraini politician.
- Rajdeep Goala – Indian politician.

=== Arts and design ===
- Dame Laura Knight – British artist.
- Mary Gillick – British sculptor and medallist.
- Keith Albarn – English artist.
- Jon Burgerman – British artist.
- Graham Budgett – Artist and educator.
- Keith Piper – Artist, curator and academic.
- Rob Ryan – British visual artist.
- Angus Tsui - Hongkonger fashion designer.
- Tim Noble and Sue Webster – British artist duo.
- Ellie Harrison – British artist.
- Donald Rodney – British artist.
- James Woodford – Sculptor.
- Arthur Spooner – British painter.
- Nick Waplington – British-American photographer.
- Lucy Orta – Contemporary visual artist.
- Samson Kambalu – Artist and academic.
- Harold Knight – British painter.
- Rayner Hoff – British sculptor.
- Lala Meredith-Vula – Photographer.
- Mel Ramsden – Conceptual artist.
- Sheila Robinson – Artist and illustrator.
- Dai Roberts – Sculptor and installation artist.
- David Tress – Anglo-Welsh artist.
- Stephen Newton – British artist.
- Peter Liddle – Landscape artist and sculptor.
- James Robert Ford – Conceptual artist.
- Noel Denholm Davis – English artist.
- Chris Harrison – Photographer.
- Paul Hart – Landscape photographer.
- John Davies – Landscape photographer.
- Tom Sandberg – Norwegian art photographer.
- Andreas Schmidt – German artist.
- Arthur Lowe – British painter.
- Arthur Henry Knighton-Hammond – Artist.
- Richard Evans – Graphic designer.
- Joseph Else – Sculptor.

=== Film, television and theatre ===
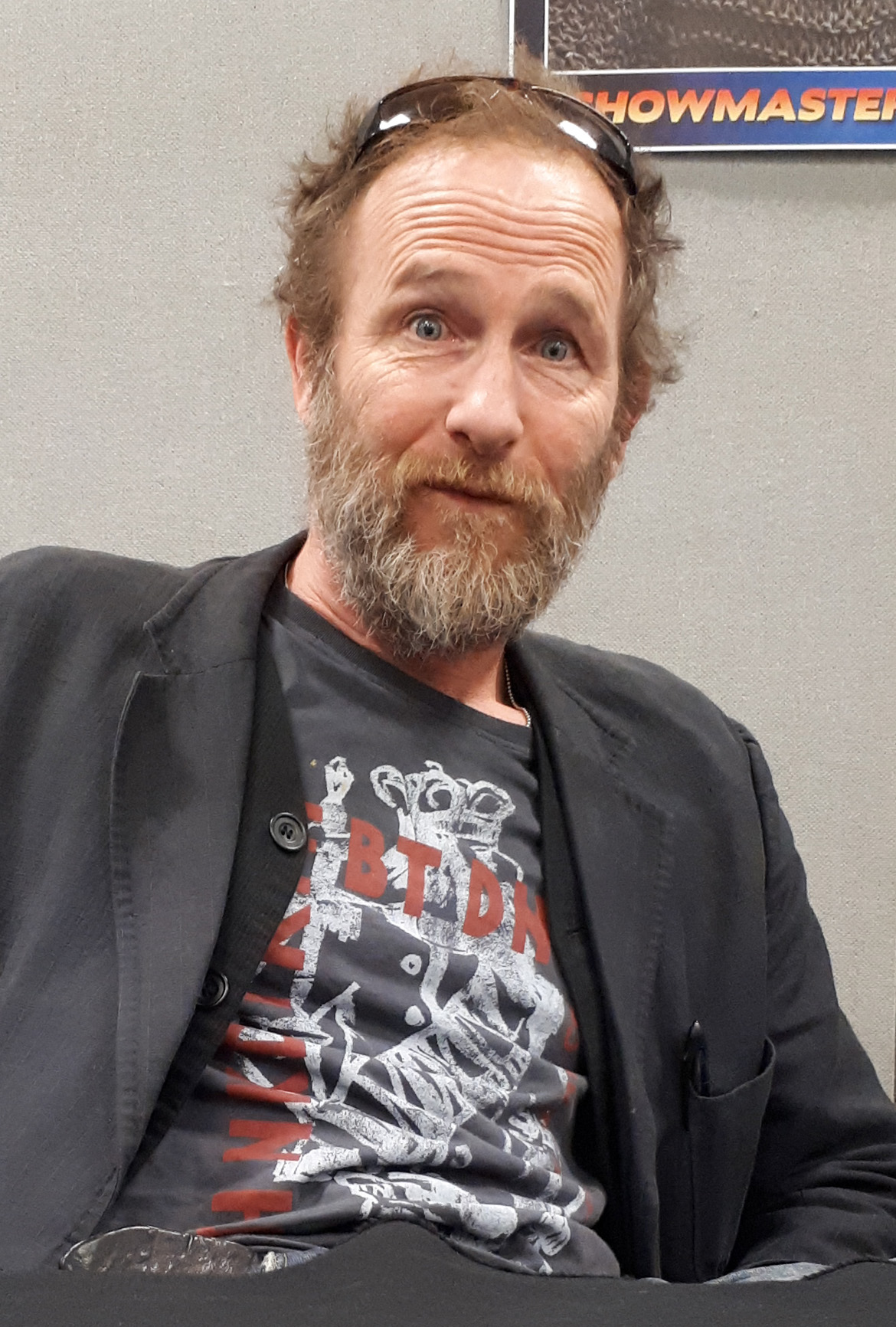
Paul Kaye, actor and comedian

- Jonathan Glazer – Film director and screenwriter.
- Matt Berry – Actor, writer and comedian.
- Ana Boulter – Actress and television presenter.
- Eddie Cooper – British actor.
- Paul Kaye – Actor and comedian.
- Hattie Naylor – Playwright.
- Jenny Tiramani – Costume and production designer.
- Sam Fell – Film director.
- Grace Keeling – Media personality and podcaster.

=== Music ===
- Steve Hogarth – Lead singer of Marillion.
- Scout Niblett – Singer-songwriter.
- Ed Macfarlane – Singer for Friendly Fires.
- Six By Seven – Alternative rock band.
- Shane Cullinan – Composer.
- Paul K. Joyce – Composer.
- Darryl Hunt – Musician with The Pogues.
- Bobby Friction – DJ.
- Stephen Jones – Musician and novelist.
- Simon Taylor-Davis – Guitarist with Klaxons.
- Freda Love Smith – Musician and author.

=== Journalism and media ===
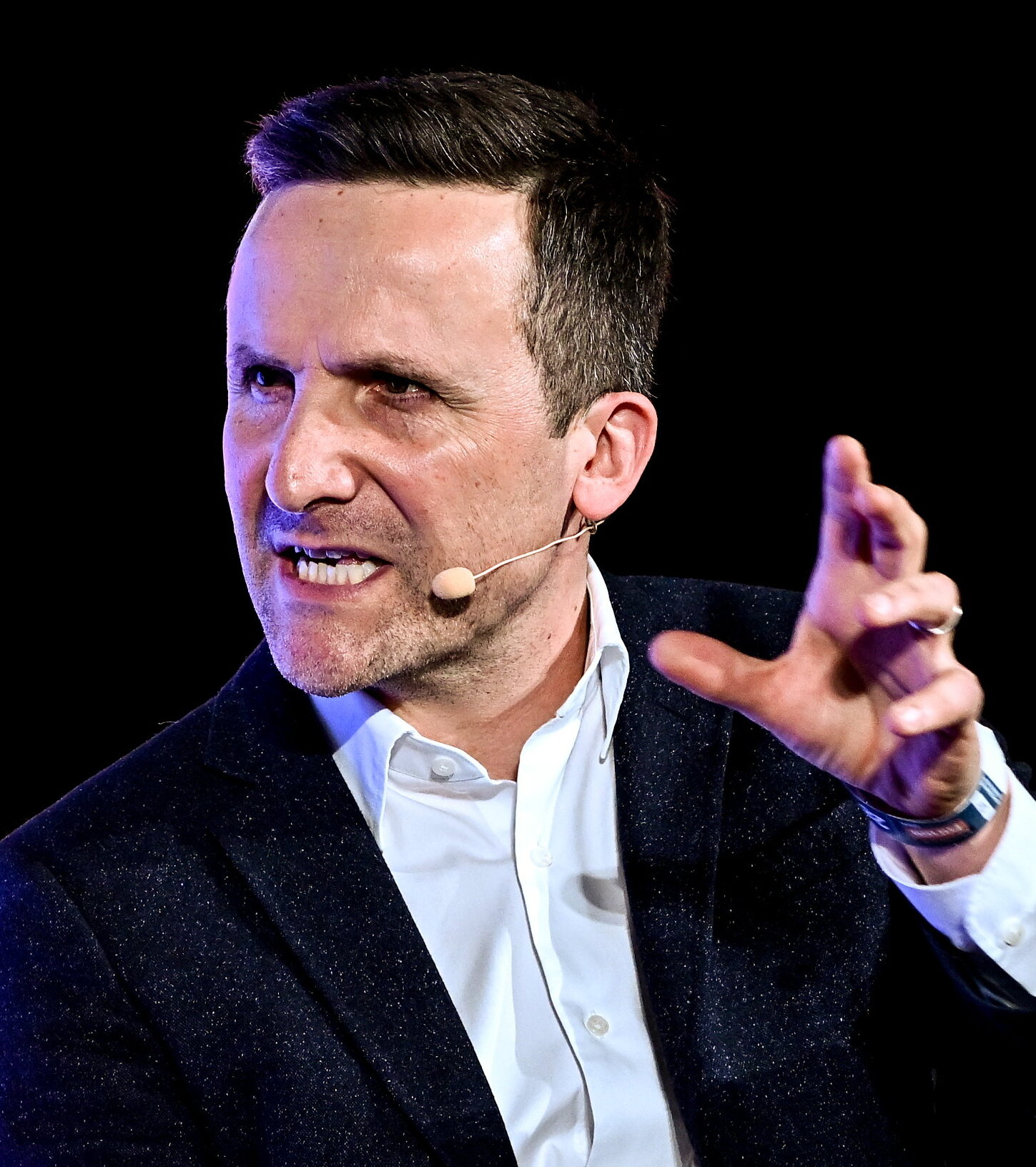
Adam Leventhal, broadcaster

- Richard Bacon – Broadcaster.
- Sonali Shah – BBC broadcaster.
- Christopher Blanchett – BBC presenter and weather forecaster.
- Stephen Dixon – Sky News presenter.
- Jack Saunders – BBC Radio 1 presenter.
- Christian O'Connell – Radio broadcaster.
- Mike Parry – Sports broadcaster.
- Amy Voce – Radio presenter.
- Paul Bradley Carr – Writer and journalist.
- Mark Crossley – Broadcaster.
- Lucy Horobin – Radio broadcaster.
- Adam Leventhal – Sports presenter.

=== Literature and publishing ===
- Alan Dapre – Children's author and playwright.
- Lynda Clark – Author of interactive fiction.
- Stewart Brown – Poet and academic.
- Neal Lawson – Political commentator.
- Paul Kenyon – Journalist and author.

=== Sport ===
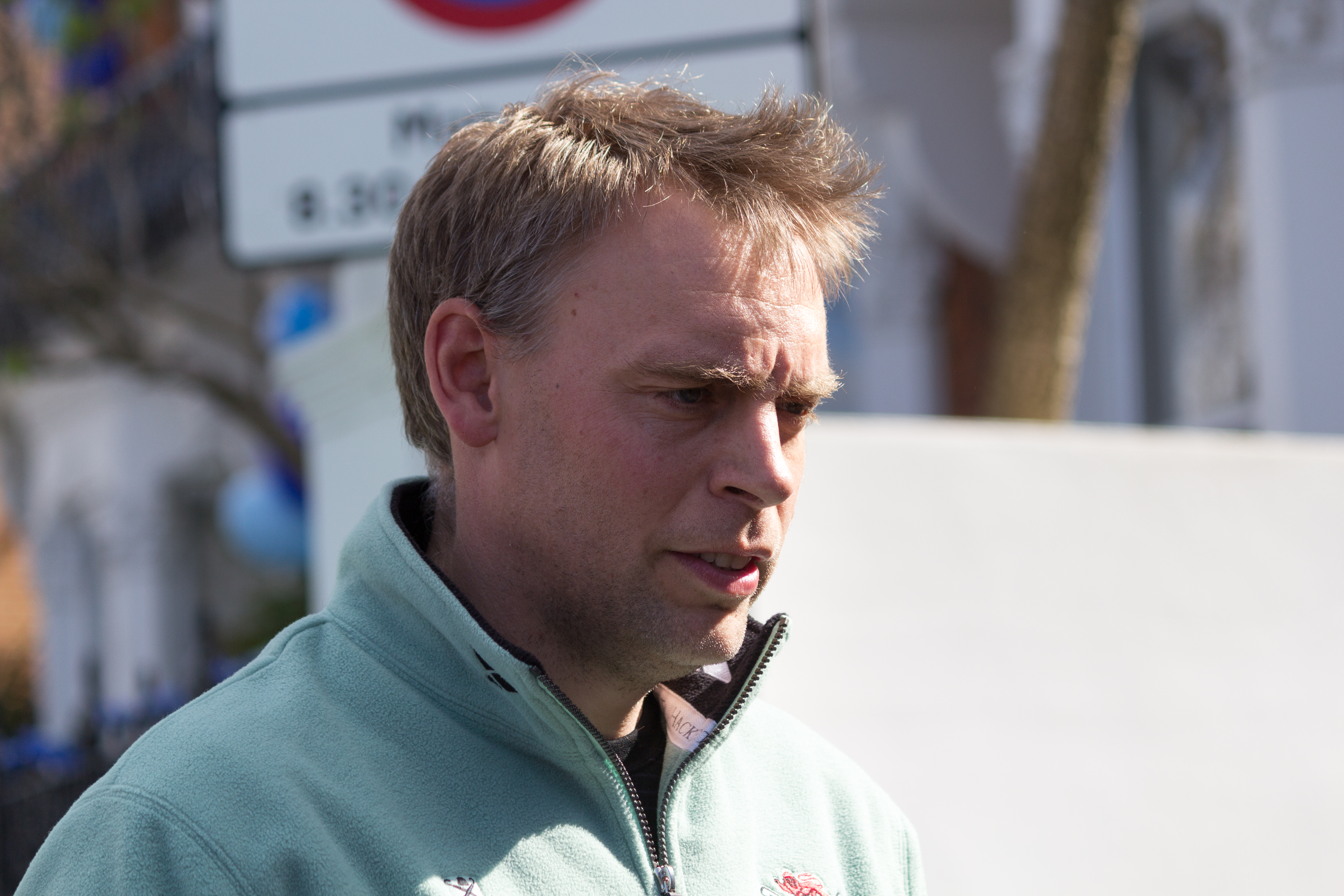
Steve Trapmore, Olympic Games gold medallist

- Steve Trapmore – Olympic gold medal-winning rower.
- Crista Cullen – Olympic gold medal-winning hockey player.
- Adam Burgess – Slalom canoeist.
- Dan Hardy – Mixed martial artist.
- Nick Easter – Rugby union player.
- Rachel Hirst – Olympic rower.
- Tom Kay – World championship gold medallist.
- Courtney Sweetman-Kirk – Professional footballer.
- James Rowe – Football manager.
- George Cooper – Professional footballer.
- Tony Galvin – Footballer.
- Ryan France – Footballer.
- Anthony Howell – Footballer.
- Alex Rodman – Footballer.
- Joe Coombs – Canoe slalom athlete.
- Richard Hounslow – Canoe slalom athlete.
- Nicholas Buckland – Ice dancer.
- Penny Coomes – Ice dancer.
- Jane Smit – England women's cricketer.
- Marc Spackman – Swimmer.
- Alastair Wilson – Hockey player.
- Sonia Tumiotto – Swimmer.

=== Business ===
- Roger Carr – Chairman of BAE Systems.
- Dave Lewis – Former CEO of Tesco.
- Jürgen Maier – Former CEO of Siemens UK.
- Paul Lester – Business executive.
- Bob Mackenzie – Businessman.
- Alex Ibru – Nigerian businessman and publisher.
- Felix Ibru – Nigerian architect and politician.
- Matthew Spacie – Entrepreneur and humanitarian.
- Chris Townsend – Senior partner at KPMG.
- Roger Southam – Chartered surveyor.

=== Academia and research ===
- Michael Driscoll – Economist and former vice-chancellor.
- Nigel Healey – Vice-chancellor of Fiji National University.
- Erold Naomab – Vice-chancellor of Namibia University of Science and Technology.
- Karen A. Smith – Management academic.
- Richard Evershed – Professor of biogeochemistry.
- Patricia Noxolo – Geographer.

== See also ==
- Nottingham Trent University
- Category:Alumni of Nottingham Trent University
