= In Theatre =

Live album by Amateur Transplants
- Released: 20 June 2009
- Recorded: January 2009
- Genre: Comedy
- Length: 56:02

Amateur Transplants chronology
Unfit to Practise (2008)	In Theatre (2009)	Have Yourself a Sweary Little Christmas (2010)

In Theatre is the third album from the parody duo Amateur Transplants, a live album released on iTunes on 20 June 2009. It first hit Number 1 in the iTunes Comedy chart on 10 July 2009.

It was recorded at a live performance in London in January 2009.

== Track listing ==
All songs written by Adam Kay and Suman Biswas.

1. "First Bit" (5:30)
2. "Second Bit" (5:21)
3. "Third Bit" (4:11)
4. "Fourth Bit" (4:19)
5. "Fifth Bit" (6:00)
6. "Sixth Bit" (5:17)
7. "Seventh Bit" (5:53)
8. "Eighth Bit" (6:05)
9. "Ninth Bit" (6:58)
10. "Tenth Bit" (6:28)

== First Bit ==
1. "King Of The Dead" – Bad Day by Daniel Powter
2. "My Name Is" – My Name Is by Eminem
3. "Information Technology" – "9 to 5" by Dolly Parton
4. "Wheat Restricted Diet" – I Predict A Riot by Kaiser Chiefs
5. "Dorsal Horn Concerto" – "Rondo" (3rd movement) from Horn Concerto No. 4 in E flat major K.495 by Wolfgang Amadeus Mozart

== Second Bit ==
1. "Anaesthetist's Hymn" – Total Eclipse Of The Heart by Bonnie Tyler
2. "Measles, Mumps and Rubella" – Umbrella by Rihanna
3. "Gay Stripper" – Day Tripper by The Beatles
4. "Letter 'B'" – Let It Be by The Beatles
5. "OCD" – Sit Down by James

== Third Bit ==
1. "John Barrowman" – Piano Man by Billy Joel
2. "All The Stuff In Ribena" – Don't Cry For Me Argentina from Evita
3. "A Broken Leg And Depression" – Under Pressure by Queen and David Bowie
4. "Take A Look At Me Nan" – Against All Odds (Take a Look at Me Now) by Phil Collins

== Fourth Bit ==
1. "Medical School Finance" – Son Of A Preacher Man by Dusty Springfield
2. "Live-In Au Pair" – Livin' On A Prayer by Bon Jovi
3. "Paediatrics" – Patience by Take That
4. "Colostomy" – (They Long to Be) Close to You by The Carpenters

== Fifth Bit ==
1. "Nutrition Clinic B (Jalapeno, Halle Berry, Halitosis, Halal Butcher)" – Hallelujah by Leonard Cohen
2. "Do They Know It's Dinnertime?" – Do They Know It's Christmas? by Band Aid

== Sixth Bit ==
1. "Joseph's Song" – Gold by Spandau Ballet
2. "Christmas Number 12" – The Twelve Days of Christmas
3. "Uhhh Uhhh Uhhh Uhhh" – Mmm Mmm Mmm Mmm by Crash Test Dummies

== Seventh Bit ==
1. "Diarrhoea" – Mamma Mia by ABBA
2. "The Time Of The Month" – Good Riddance (Time of Your Life) by Green Day
3. "Respiratory Clinic A" – Easy by Commodores
4. "Well Man Clinic" – Don't Know Why by Norah Jones
5. "Respiratory Clinic B" – The Girl From Ipanema by Astrud Gilberto
6. "Department of Surgery" – Complicated by Avril Lavigne

== Eighth Bit ==
1. "I Get My Dick Out Of You" – I Get A Kick Out Of You by Jamie Cullum
2. "7 Dwarfs" - 7 Days by Craig David
3. "Sing a Song of Sixpence" (based on traditional poem Sing a Song of Sixpence)
4. "Eleven" – Heaven by Bryan Adams
5. "Couples Counselling C" – Breakfast at Tiffany's by Deep Blue Something
6. "Footloose" – Footloose by Kenny Loggins
7. "Couples Counselling B" – Build Me Up Buttercup by The Foundations

== Ninth Bit ==
1. "Couples Counselling A" – Sorry Seems to Be the Hardest Word by Elton John and Bernie Taupin
2. "Couples Counselling D" – The Bare Necessities from The Jungle Book
3. "Urology Clinic A" – Ob-la-di, Ob-la-da by The Beatles
4. "What I Went to SKL 4" – What I Go to School For by Busted
5. "One Hand" – Hand In My Pocket by Alanis Morissette
6. "Libel Case" – Grace Kelly by Mika

== Tenth Bit ==
1. "Circle Line" – Circle of Life from The Lion King
2. "London Underground (Part I)" – Going Underground by The Jam
3. "Paul Weller" – Yellow by Coldplay
4. "London Underground (Part II)" – Going Underground by The Jam
5. "Paracetamoxyfrusebendroneomycin" – Supercalifragilisticexpialidocious from Mary Poppins
