= Unfit to Practise =

Studio album by Amateur Transplants
- Released: September 2008
- Recorded: 2007–2008
- Genre: Comedy
- Length: 39:28

Amateur Transplants chronology
Fitness to Practice (2004)	Unfit to Practise (2008)	In Theatre (2009)

Unfit to Practise is the second album from the parody duo Amateur Transplants.

== Production ==
The Amateur Transplants released their first album Fitness to Practice in 2004. The band received little attention however until 2005 when their song from their debut album, London Underground, a parody of Going Underground by The Jam, went viral, receiving millions of views on YouTube. From 2005 the duo began to write many more songs for the second album, in 2007 they sang many of these for the first time on their live tour, The Black and White Menstrual Tour. The album was then released on CD in 2008 to little attention however in 2010 it was released on Spotify, iTunes and Amazon.com, three songs from the album now have over 50,000 plays on Spotify.

== Track listing ==
All songs written by Adam Kay and Suman Biswas.

1. "Masochism Tango 2008" (1:59)
2. "Anaesthetist's Hymn" (1:48)
3. "Sheila's Wheels" (1:08)
4. "Finals Fantasy" (4:36)
5. "Beautiful Song" (3:05)
6. "King of the Dead" (0:45)
7. "New Man Song" (2:01)
8. "Libel Case" (0:56)
9. "Paediatrics" (1:03)
10. "Information Technology" (0:49)
11. "Department of Surgery" (1:12)
12. "Respiratory Clinic A" (0:55)
13. "Respiratory Clinic B" (0:20)
14. "Urology Clinic A" (0:48)
15. "Urology Clinic B" (0:29)
16. "Nutrition Clinic A" (0:53)
17. "Nutrition Clinic B" (0:56)
18. "Sleep Studies" (0:58)
19. "Psychiatry" (1:13)
20. "Gynaecology" (0:53)
21. "Phobia Medicine" (0:21)
22. "Well Man Clinic" (1:05)
23. "Learning Difficulties" (0:25)
24. "Geriatrics" (0:53)
25. "Medical School Finance" (0:44)
26. "Medical School Admissions" (0:48)
27. "Couples Counselling A" (1:36)
28. "Couples Counselling B" (0:44)
29. "Couples Counselling C" (0:47)
30. "Couples Counselling D" (1:25)
31. "I Am What I Am" [Bonus track] (2:03)
32. "London Underground" [Bonus track] (2:04)

=== Parody information ===
1. Masochism Tango 2008 - The Masochism Tango by Tom Lehrer
2. Anaesthetist's Hymn - Total Eclipse of the Heart by Bonnie Tyler
3. Sheila's Wheels - Theme music from the UK Sheilas' Wheels television advertisements
4. Finals Fantasy - I Know Him So Well by Barbara Dickson and Elaine Paige from Chess
5. Beautiful Song - You're Beautiful by James Blunt
6. King of the Dead - Bad Day by Daniel Powter
7. New Man Song - I'm like a Bird by Nelly Furtado
8. Libel Case - Grace Kelly by Mika
9. Paediatrics - Patience by Take That
10. Information Technology - 9 to 5 by Dolly Parton
11. Department of Surgery - Complicated by Avril Lavigne
12. Respiratory Clinic A - Easy by Commodores
13. Respiratory Clinic B - The Girl From Ipanema by Astrud Gilberto
14. Urology Clinic A - Ob-La-Di, Ob-La-Da by The Beatles
15. Urology Clinic B - Walk Like an Egyptian by The Bangles
16. Nutrition Clinic A - Cannonball by Damien Rice
17. Nutrition Clinic B - Hallelujah - by Leonard Cohen
18. Sleep Studies - In Your Eyes by Kylie Minogue
19. Psychiatry - Sit Down by James
20. Gynaecology - Tiny Dancer by Elton John
21. Phobia Medicine - Survivor by Destiny's Child
22. Well Man Clinic - Don't Know Why by Norah Jones
23. Learning Difficulties - She's Electric by Oasis
24. Geriatrics - Girl All the Bad Guys Want by Bowling for Soup
25. Medical School Finance - Son of a Preacher Man by Dusty Springfield
26. Medical School Admissions - You Gotta Be by Des'ree
27. Couples Counselling A - Sorry Seems to Be the Hardest Word by Elton John and Bernie Taupin
28. Couples Counselling B - Build Me Up Buttercup by The Foundations
29. Couples Counselling C - Breakfast at Tiffany's by Deep Blue Something
30. Couples Counselling D - The Bare Necessities from The Jungle Book
31. I Am What I Am - I Am What I Am from La Cage aux Folles
32. London Underground Remix - Going Underground by The Jam (A new version of London Underground as included on Fitness to Practice album with a significant change to the lyric to include a reference to the 7/7 Underground bomb attacks)
