= Lucas Meijs =

Dutch organizational theorist (born 1963)

Lucas C.P.M. Meijs (born 27 December 1963) a Dutch organizational theorist and Professor Volunteering, Civil Society and Businesses at the department Business-Society Management of the Rotterdam School of Management, Erasmus University Rotterdam and Professor Strategic Philanthropy at the Erasmus Centre for Strategic Philanthropy.

== Biography ==
Born in Haarlem, Meijs studied Business Administration at Erasmus University Rotterdam and received a Ph.D. in Business Administration in 1997. The title of his doctoral thesis was Management of Volunteer Organizations.

In the summer of 1999, Lucas Meijs was a visiting scholar at the Department of Political Science and the School of Social Work at the University of Georgia, Athens, GA. In 2003, he was appointed Professor Volunteering, Civil Society and Businesses at the business faculty of Erasmus University Rotterdam. In addition, in 2003, Meijs was a guest researcher at the Centre of Philanthropy and Nonprofit studies, Queensland University of Technology in Brisbane, Australia. In 2010, Meijs was appointed Professor Strategic Philanthropy at the Erasmus Centre for Strategic Philanthropy.

Since July 2010, Lucas Meijs further is editor in chief of Nonprofit and Voluntary Sector Quarterly, the journal of the Association for Research on Nonprofit Organizations and Voluntary Action (ARNOVA). He shares this function with Femida Handy of the University of Pennsylvania and Jeffrey L. Brudney of Cleveland State University.

== Work ==
Meijs' research is focused on issues regarding strategic philanthropy, volunteer management, managing non-profit organizations, corporate social responsibility, relations between companies and non-profit organizations, voluntary energy, student volunteering and involved learning.

One of this main contributions is the concept of "volunteerability". Based on employability, he argued that to be more likely to overcome obstacles and become a volunteer, one needs the motivation, availability, and capability required to volunteer.

== Publications ==
Publications, a selection:

- Meijs, Lucas CPM, and Ludovicus Caspar Petrus Maria Meijs. Management van vrijwilligersorganisaties:(Management of volunteer organizations). NOV Publikaties, 1997.
- Handy, Femida, et al. "Public perception of" who is a volunteer": An examination of the net-cost approach from a cross-cultural perspective." Voluntas: International Journal of Voluntary and Nonprofit Organizations 11.1 (2000): 45–65.
- Meijs, Lucas CPM, et al. All in the Eyes of the Beholder?. Springer US, 2003.
- Handy, Femida, et al. "A cross-cultural examination of student volunteering: is it all about résumé building?." Nonprofit and Voluntary Sector Quarterly 39.3 (2010): 498–523.
- Haski-Leventhal, Debbie, Lucas CPM Meijs, and Lesley Hustinx. "The third-party model: Enhancing volunteering through governments, corporations and educational institutes." Journal of Social Policy 39.01 (2010): 139–158.
