= Arnova =

Arnova is:

- a last name
  - Alba Arnova (1930–2018), an Italian ballerina and film actress
- an association name
  - Arnova Technology Hong Kong, China, previously Archos Technology Hong Kong
  - Association for Research on Nonprofit Organizations and Voluntary Action (ARNOVA), founded as Association of Voluntary Action Scholars
