= The Friday Project =

Publishing house

- Parent company: HarperCollins
- Founded: 2004
- Founder: Paul Carr and Clare Christian
- Defunct: 2014
- Country of origin: United Kingdom
- Headquarters location: London
- Publication types: Books
- Official website: harpercollins.co.uk

The Friday Project was a London-based independent publishing house, founded by Paul Carr and Clare Christian in June 2004. It evolved out of The Friday Thing, an Internet newsletter taking an offbeat look at the week's politics, media activities and general current events, originally written together with Charlie Skelton.

The Project was wholly concerned with finding material on the web and then turning it into traditional books, to the exclusion of normal publishing models. Additionally, they made a large amount of their output available free to download as part of the Creative Commons license.

== History ==
In 2006, The Friday Project announced that it had hired Scott Pack, then Buying Manager at bookshop chain Waterstones, as TFP's Commercial Director. Pack took up the post in September 2006. In his job at Waterstones, Pack was once described by a newspaper as being seen by 'many' otherwise unidentified people as 'the most powerful man in the books trade' for his ability to decide which new titles will be successful.

The Friday Project also had an audio arm, which was responsible for the CD Fitness to Practice by Amateur Transplants. The album included "London Underground".

During 2006, Pack courted controversy with his 'Me and My Big Mouth' blog. Positioned as an irreverent commentary on the UK book trade it sparked a number of national press stories and was highly critical of lead retailers Waterstones and W H Smith. In December 2006, it was reported that Carr – along with Online Editor, Graham Pond – had left The Friday Project with Carr leading a buy-out of the company's Internet media arm to create a new company, Friday Cities.

In 2007, Clare Christian announced the launch of Friday Fiction, a new imprint for original fiction discovered on the web and The Friday Project was shortlisted for two industry awards (or Nibbies), one for Innovation in the Book Industry for their commitment to making their books available under a Creative Commons license, and Clare Christian won the Nibbie for UK Young Publisher of the Year.

=== Liquidation and sale ===
Following losses in excess of £1,700,000, the Friday Project went into liquidation on 30 March 2008. In May 2008 HarperCollins UK bought certain assets of The Friday Project from its administrator, hiring Scott Pack, Clare Christian, and taking on several front and backlist titles.

=== Closure ===
In 2014, the Bookseller magazine reported that Scott Pack was departing the Friday Project and that the imprint "will now be wound down".
