= PandoDaily =

Technology news website

- Website type: Technology news and analysis
- Available in: English
- Owner: BuySellAds
- Founder: Sarah Lacy
- Editor: Paul Carr
- Website: www.pando.com
- Launched: January 16, 2012; 14 years ago

PandoDaily, or simply Pando, was a web publication offering technology news, analysis, and commentary, with a focus on Silicon Valley and startup companies.

== History ==
PandoDaily was started by former TechCrunch writer Sarah Lacy on January 16, 2012. At the time, Business Insider called it "TechCrunch 2.0". It billed itself at launch as "the site of record for Silicon Valley".

The name was inspired by a tree colony in Utah, Pando, whose massive root system covers 106 acres and is continually sprouting new stems or trunks, even after wildfires have destroyed existing trunks. "It’s the perfect metaphor for what I love about Silicon Valley. It’s not just individual hot startups of-the-moment; it’s that unique startup ecosystem that continually shoots up new companies no matter how frothy or scorched everything above ground gets", she wrote.

At launch, PandoDaily had a number of staff writers and guest contributors including Michael Arrington (founder of TechCrunch), Paul Carr, M.G. Siegler, and Farhad Manjoo. Because of a disagreement, Michael Arrington and M.G. Siegler stopped writing for PandoDaily, but they acquired new technology writers including Greg Kumparak (formerly of TechCrunch).

In November 2013, it was announced that PandoDaily had acquired NSFW Corp, a politics-and-humor website founded by technology journalist Paul Carr. PandoDaily stated that the goal of the acquisition was to double down on investigative reporting. Carr then became editorial director of PandoDaily.

In late June 2015, PandoDaily switched to a subscription model, with most of their articles behind a paywall. Any subscriber could unlock an article for 48 hours (with a limit of 20 unlocks per month) and the authors and editors generally unlocked recent articles and tweeted them to readers. Their main reason for the change was to maintain their editorial independence and integrity without being too dependent on particular advertisers (for revenue) or particular investors.

On October 23, 2019, Lacy announced that Pando had been sold to one of its partners, BuySellAds, and that she had retired from journalism to focus on her new venture Chairman Mom—a community for "working women". Lacy cited a history of sexual harassment as justification, explaining that Silicon Valley was "a place where I've been lied about, where VCs have arm-twisted editors to fire me, where billionaires have threatened those doing business with me to cut all ties. It's a place where I've had people turn on me again and again and again simply for doing my job. It's a place I've been betrayed by people I trusted. It's a place where one-time friends threatened my children because I wrote about things they did."

== Notoriety ==
=== Union remarks controversy ===
PandoDaily's creator Sarah Lacy was quoted by American Public Media's Marketplace concerning the Bay Area Rapid Transit worker strike of July 2013:

People in the tech industry feel like life is a meritocracy. You work really hard, you build something and you create something, which is sort of directly opposite to unions.

Her comments concerning the work ethic of union workers received criticism.

=== Uber controversy ===
On October 22, 2014, an article by Lacy on PandoDaily was published where she sharply criticised the "asshole culture" of Uber and said she intended to delete the mobile app from her phone. On November 17, 2014, BuzzFeed editor-in-chief Ben Smith reported that Uber senior executive Emil Michael "outlined the notion of spending 'a million dollars'" to hire four top opposition researchers and four journalists. He said that team could help Uber fight back against the press by looking into "personal lives, your families". Michael was particularly focused on journalist Sarah Lacy, who accused Uber of “sexism and misogyny". Lacy wrote a sharp response critical of Uber's actions. The controversy was picked up by CNBC, Business Insider, and The New York Times Bits blog. Michael Wolff, the journalist who had arranged for and invited Smith to the private dinner where the controversial remarks were made, wrote a lengthy piece about the controversy, stating that Uber executives had believed that the event was off-the-record, but that he (Wolff) had failed to communicate the information to Smith.
