= Have Yourself a Merry Little Christmas (disambiguation) =

"Have Yourself a Merry Little Christmas" is a 1943 song written by Hugh Martin and Ralph Blane.

Have Yourself a Merry Little Christmas may also refer to:

- Have Yourself a Merry Little Christmas (album), by Kurt Nilsen, 2010
- Have Yourself a Merry Little Christmas (EP), by Diana Krall, 1998

== See also ==
- A Merry Little Christmas (disambiguation)
- Have Yourself a Meaty Little Christmas, a 2009 album by the cast of Aqua Teen Hunger Force
- Have Yourself a Sweary Little Christmas, a 2010 comedy album by the Amateur Transplants
