= Fitness to Practice =

Studio album by Amateur Transplants
- Released: 2004
- Recorded: Imperial College London Studios
- Genre: Comedy
- Length: 46:50
- Producer: Rosh G

Amateur Transplants chronology
Fitness to Practice (2004)	Unfit to Practise (2008)

Fitness to Practice is a 2004 album produced for charity by Amateur Transplants (Adam Kay and Suman Biswas). 10% of the profits from the album sales go to Macmillan Cancer Relief.

A remastered version of the album available with two bonus tracks, "Northern Birds" and "What I Went to SKL 4". The album is published on the Friday Audio label of The Friday Project.

The album contains extremely strong language and therefore, according to the official website, "should not be bought for an elderly maiden aunt".

In 2019, Kay apologised for some of the songs in the album as being in "terrible taste".

== Track listing ==
1. "Paracetamoxyfrusebendroneomycin" (3:04)
2. "Nothing at All" (3:58)
3. "Finals Countdown" (3:04)
4. "Your Baby" (3:03)
5. "Disney Time" (4:19)
6. "Eternal Clerking" (3:04)
7. "The Menstrual Rag" (1:57)
8. "London Underground" (1:57)
9. "Mr Burton" (2:55)
10. "Snippets" (7:24)
11. "Careless Surgeon" (3:04)
12. "Dorsal Horn Concerto" (2:41)
13. "The Drugs Song" (1:33)
14. "Always Look on the Bright Side" (3:03)
15. "A Letter to the Patient's GP Please, Angela" (1:47)

Bonus tracks:

- 16. "Northern Birds" (3:40)
- 17. "What I Went to SKL 4" (1:48)

"Paracetamoxyfrusebendroneomycin", "Nothing at All", "The Menstrual Rag", "London Underground", "Snippets", "The Drugs Song" and two new songs, the "NHS Song" (a parody of Nizlopi's "JCB Song") and "Sheila's Wheels" (a parody of the jingle for a car insurance television advert in the UK), could be downloaded for free at the official website, albeit at a lower quality.

=== Parody information ===
1. "Paracetamoxyfrusebendroneomycin" - "Supercalifragilisticexpialidocious" from Walt Disney's Mary Poppins.
2. "Nothing at All" - "When You Say Nothing at All" by Paul Overstreet and Don Schlitz, covered by Ronan Keating
3. "Finals Countdown" - "We Didn't Start the Fire" by Billy Joel
4. "Your Baby" - "My Baby Just Cares for Me" by Walter Donaldson (music) and Gus Kahn (lyrics), best-known version by Nina Simone
5. "Disney Time" - "Under The Sea" from Walt Disney's The Little Mermaid and "The Lion Sleeps Tonight" by The Tokens
6. "Eternal Clerking" - "Eternal Flame" by The Bangles
7. "The Menstrual Rag" - "The Vatican Rag" by Tom Lehrer
8. "London Underground" - "Going Underground" by The Jam
9. "Mr Burton" - "Any Dream Will Do" from Joseph and the Amazing Technicolor Dreamcoat by Andrew Lloyd Webber and Tim Rice
10. "Snippets" - "Hand in My Pocket" by Alanis Morissette, "Macarena" by Los del Río, "Yellow" by Coldplay, "If I Only Had A Brain" from The Wizard of Oz by Harold Arlen (music) and E.Y. Harburg (lyrics), "Against All Odds (Take A Look At Me Now)" by Phil Collins, "Sultans of Swing" by Dire Straits, "One" by U2, "Take On Me" by A-ha
11. "Careless Surgeon" - "Careless Whisper" by George Michael
12. "Dorsal Horn Concerto" - "Rondo" (3rd movement) from Horn Concerto No. 4 in E flat major K.495 by Wolfgang Amadeus Mozart.
13. "The Drugs Song" - "The Elements" by Tom Lehrer, which was based around the tune of "I am the very model of a modern Major-General" from The Pirates of Penzance by Gilbert and Sullivan
14. "Always Look on the Bright Side" - "Always Look on the Bright Side of Life" from Monty Python's Life of Brian by Eric Idle
15. "A Letter to the Patient's GP Please, Angela" - a poem, spoken in rhythm by Adam Kay, and inspired by a song by David "The Machine" Christensen

Bonus tracks:

- 16. "Northern Birds" - "More Than Words" by Extreme
- 17. "What I Went to SKL 4" - "What I Go to School For" by Busted
