= Home (Deep Blue Something album) =

Studio album by Deep Blue Something
- Released: October 24, 1994
- Studio: Alley Cat (Denton, Texas)
- Genre: Power pop, folk rock
- Length: 49:18
- Label: RainMaker (1994); Interscope (1995)
- Producer: Deep Blue Something, David Castell

Deep Blue Something chronology
11th Song (1993)	Home (1994)	Byzantium (1998)

Home is the second studio album by American band Deep Blue Something. It was released by RainMaker Records in 1994, and rereleased on Interscope in 1995. The band supported the album by touring with Duran Duran.

== Production ==
The songs were written and sung by the Pipes brothers.

== Critical reception ==
Professional ratings
Review scores
Source	Rating
AllMusic	3/5 stars
The Austin Chronicle	0/5 stars

Trouser Press wrote: "Bringing the brain-dead grandiosity of late-'70s harmony-rockers like Styx and Supertramp to the modern world, Deep Blue Something ... combines big acoustic/electric strumming and airy, melodramatic singing into a resoundingly hollow album unimproved by its good intentions." The Washington Post stated: "A folk-rock band that frequently attacks its material with hard-rock vehemence, Deep Blue Something is the latest Southern combo to mate R.E.M. with '70s mainstream rock."

The Austin Chronicle awarded the album zero stars (out of five), deeming it "lame," and its hit single "safely stupid." The Philadelphia Inquirer called Home "a melodic amalgamation of kicky power pop, hair-in-your-face shoe-gazer drone, and neo-progressive '70s guitar rock, all infused with punk energy, sly optimism, and plenty of jangly guitars."

AllMusic praised the "power-pop sound straight out of late-'70s/early-'80s Great Britain."

== Track listing ==
All songs written by Todd Pipes, except where noted.

1. "Gammer Gerten's Needle" [Instrumental] – 3:17
2. "Breakfast at Tiffany's" (Re-recorded version) – 4:20
3. "Halo" – 2:48
4. "Josey" (Toby Pipes / Kirk Tatom) – 3:23
5. "A Water Prayer" – 3:22
6. "Done" (Toby Pipes / Todd Pipes) – 3:21
7. "Song to Make Love To" (Todd Pipes / Toby Pipes) – 3:09
8. "The Kandinsky Prince" – 2:28
9. "Home" – 4:13
10. "Red Light" (Toby Pipes) – 4:28
11. "I Can Wait" – 3:03
12. "Wouldn't Change a Thing" – 4:05
13. "Dear Prudence" (Lennon / McCartney) – 3:05
14. "Sun" (Todd Pipes / Toby Pipes / Kirk Tatom) – 4:17

== Personnel ==
=== Band members ===
- Todd Pipes – bass guitar, acoustic & electric guitars, keyboards, lead & backing vocals
- Toby Pipes – acoustic & electric guitars, keyboards, lead & backing vocals
- Kirk Tatom – acoustic & electric guitars, bass guitar, keyboards, backing vocals
- John Kirtland – drums, percussion

=== Production ===
- David Castell – producer, engineer (track 2), mastering, mixing
- Greg Ellenwood – engineer (tracks 1, 3–12)
- Gil Pena – cover art
- Robert Greeson – art direction
- James Bland – band photo
- Manish Patel – "cigarette and match strike" (track 9)

== Charts ==
=== Weekly charts ===
Chart (1996)	Peak position
Australian Albums (ARIA)	31
Austrian Albums (Ö3 Austria)	32
Dutch Albums (Album Top 100)	26
German Albums (Offizielle Top 100)	16
Scottish Albums (OCC)	24
Swedish Albums (Sverigetopplistan)	39
Swiss Albums (Schweizer Hitparade)	20
UK Albums (OCC)	24
US Billboard 200	46

=== Year-end charts ===
Chart (1996)	Position
US Billboard 200	156

== Certifications ==
Region	Certification	Certified units/sales
United States (RIAA)	Gold	500,000^{^}
^{^} Shipments figures based on certification alone.
