= Deep Blue Something (album) =

Studio album by Deep Blue Something
- Released: December 10, 2001
- Recorded: 1996–2001
- Genres: Alternative rock, pop rock
- Length: 51:49
- Label: Aezra
- Producers: Deep Blue Something, Charles Fisher

Deep Blue Something chronology
Byzantium (1998)	Deep Blue Something (2001)	Lunar Phase (2025)

Deep Blue Something is the fourth studio album by alternative rock band Deep Blue Something. It was released on Aezra in 2001.

== Details ==
While this is the band's fourth album, it was only the third to be released in the US, as Byzantium never was. This is likely why five tracks from Byzantium were included in this album, alongside the eight new tracks.

== Track listing ==
No.	Title	Writer(s)	Length
1.	"Military Man"	Toby Pipes, Clay Bergus	5:08
2.	"So Precious" (originally from Byzantium)	Deep Blue Something	3:04
3.	"She Is" (originally from Byzantium)	Deep Blue Something, Matthew Wilder	3:26
4.	"Burning a Past"	Deep Blue Something	3:23
5.	"Higher"	Todd Pipes, Toby Pipes, Clay Bergus, Jeff Whittington	4:35
6.	"Number One"	Toby Pipes	3:47
7.	"Hell in Itself" (originally from Byzantium)	Todd Pipes, Toby Pipes	4:07
8.	"Who Wants It"	Todd Pipes, Toby Pipes	2:25
9.	"Focus"	Toby Pipes	4:11
10.	"Parkbench" (originally from Byzantium)	Toby Pipes	5:00
11.	"Page Me Wolverine"	Todd Pipes	3:18
12.	"Enough to Get By" (originally from Byzantium)	Todd Pipes, Toby Pipes	5:13
13.	"Beautiful Nightmare"	Todd Pipes, Toby Pipes, Greg Wells, Charlotte Caffey	5:13
Total length:			51:49

== Personnel ==
=== Deep Blue Something ===
- Todd Pipes – bass guitar, lead & backing vocals
- Toby Pipes – acoustic & electric guitars, lead & backing vocals
- Clay Bergus – acoustic & electric guitars, backing vocals
- John Kirtland – drums, percussion

=== Additional musicians ===
- Jeff Roe – trombone, horns arrangement
- Randy Burgeson – trumpet
- Dave Monsch – baritone sax
- Peter Hyrka – violin, strings arrangement
- David Angel – violin
- Cate Myer – violin
- Alan Umstead – violin
- Gary Tussing – cello
- Ron de la Vega – cello
- Paulinho Dacosta – percussion
- Jeff Whittington – keyboards
