= 11th Song =

Studio album by Deep Blue Something
- Released: October 13, 1993
- Recorded: March – July 1993
- Studio: Reeltime Studios in Dallas, Texas.
- Genre: Alternative rock
- Length: 44:14
- Label: Doberman
- Producer: Deep Blue Something

Deep Blue Something chronology
11th Song (1993)	Home (1994)

11th Song is the debut studio album by alternative rock band Deep Blue Something. It was released on Doberman Records in 1993.

== Details ==
Doberman Records was headed by Louis Bickel, Jr. Bickel had first met the band in 1992 when they were called "Leper Messiah", and becoming friendly with them, learned they were trying to release a debut CD but lacked the financing to do so. In late 1992, Bickel paid at least $3,000 to finance the recording of the album. Initially the CD had modest sales, primarily sold at the band's shows, but sales grew. The album's version of "Breakfast at Tiffany's" was later re-recorded for the band's next album, Home.

== Track listing ==
No.	Title	Length
1.	"One for Reality"	4:50
2.	"Raise Your Hands"	5:16
3.	"7 A.M."	4:09
4.	"You"	3:29
5.	"She'll Go to Pieces"	5:11
6.	"Someday"	4:40
7.	"No More"	2:50
8.	"Loneliest Man"	4:39
9.	"What a Single Word Can Do"	3:52
10.	"Breakfast at Tiffany's"	5:18
Total length:		44:14

Hidden track
No.	Title	Length
1.	"11th Song"	9:44

== Personnel ==
- Todd Pipes – bass guitar, lead & backing vocals
- Toby Pipes – acoustic & electric guitars, lead & backing vocals
- John Kirtland – drums, percussion
