= Geek Pop =

Online music festival

Geek Pop was an online music festival established in 2008 that featured artists inspired by science. In the first festival, hosted by the website Null Hypothesis: The Journal of Unlikely Science, attendees could only download a podcast featuring songs about science as a radio-style festival report. After 2009, the festival moved to its website where listeners could listen to music for free and download radio-style report podcasts called the "highlights podcast." The Geek Pop website also produces a monthly podcast, and has hosted live events. As of June 2016, the festival and website are no longer active.

== Background ==
Online festivals first began in 2003 at the Exposure Festival. Online festivals have a set launch time but don't happen in a fixed location, instead, they're available online after their launch date.

Similar to festivals, online festivals had a set time and celebrated a particular aspect of a community, albeit an online community. The emergence of social media has enabled people to communicate with each other during online festivals. At Geek Pop festivals, this communication was primarily achieved through an online "bar," which used Twitter on the website to show tweets about Geek Pop.

There are environmental benefits to having an online festival as opposed to, or in conjunction with, a real festival. Half of the acts that played in 2008 were from overseas, but no carbon was used to "bring" them to a primarily UK audience. There was no litter or waste generated by the festival and the majority of the marketing was done online, reducing the amount of paper used.

== Geek Pop '08 ==
=== Song list ===
- Amateur Transplants – Anaesthetist's Hymn
- Jonny Berliner – Dark Matter
- Let's Tea Party – Reptiles
- Down with Gender – The Robot Island
- Tales from the Birdbath – The Scientist
- Logan Wright - Zero
- Photomixers – Hotel Mauna Kea
- Professor Science featuring Athena Currier – Sweet Home Apparatus
- Emily Schulman – Dinosaur Extinction

=== Media recognition ===
Geek Pop '08 was mentioned during podcasts from the Guardian and Nature, receiving positive reviews from both – "There were many highlights, but [our] pick of the bunch [is] Dark Matter by science troubadour Johnny Berliner", said Nature. Laboratory Talk said that, "this virtual festival has much to commend it… My personal highpoint was the aching rendition of Hotel Mauna Kea by the Photomixers, demonstrating simultaneously pathos, humor, and even a little musical talent." Since March 2008 it has also been featured on Australia's Diffusion Science Radio's 2008 Christmas Special as well as the Mr. Science Show.

== Geek Pop '09 ==
Geek Pop '09 was launched on March 6, 2009. Alongside the two virtual stages imagined in the podcast from the previous year, the reproductive stage and the Tesla Tent, the festival introduced a new main stage which will be called the Tetrahedron stage (in homage to Glastonbury's Pyramid stage). The major difference between the 2009 festival and the previous year was its relocation to a standalone website and the introduction of an interactive festival map that allowed listeners to choose songs to listen to.

== Geek Pop 2010 ==
Geek Pop 2010 occurred on 12–21 March 2010 and featured a 5th virtual stage for science comedy, named the Comical Flask. There were also two live performances, one in Bristol at the Cube Microplex, and one in London at The Miller.

Notable acts that contributed to the online festival and live events include Baba Brinkman, Dr Stuart Clark as Dr. Stu and the Neutron Stars, Bert Miller & the Animal Folk, Dr. Martin Austwick from Answer Me This! podcast as The Sound of the Ladies and Jonny Berliner.

Baba Brinkman's "Rationalist Anthem" Off That appeared exclusively as part of Geek Pop 2010, featuring a video animated by Tommy Nagle.

== Geek Pop 2011 ==
The launch of Geek Pop 2011 coincided again with The British Science Association National Science and Engineering Week. The online festival went live March 11, 2011 and a live launch gig occurred at Wilton's Music Hall in London on March 10, 2011. The festival featured music from Jeffrey Lewis, Amateur Transplants, Dr. Martin Austwick, Helen Arney and Jonny Berliner. The Amateur Transplants, Martin Austwick and Helen Arney all performed live at the Wilton's Music Hall launch gig.

For the first time, some of the music was available for purchase only, on a mini album called Geek Like Me.

=== Geek Like Me - Track Listing ===
1. "Animals" by Helen Arney with Mr Simmonds featuring Professor Elemental – 4:01
2. "An Element Sends a Postcard Home" by Spirit of Play – 3:08
3. "The Day of the Snail" by The Sound of the Ladies – 4:12
4. "Radio Gagarin" by Karmadillo – 4:23
5. "DNA (The Genetics Calypso)" by Jonny Berliner – 2:49
6. Brokeback Workbench" by MJ Hibbett and Vom Vorton – 2:47

== Geek Pop 2012 ==
There was no Geek Pop festival in 2012 due to other commitments from the organizers, Jim Bell and Hayley Birch.
