= Sarah Lacy =

American technology journalist and author

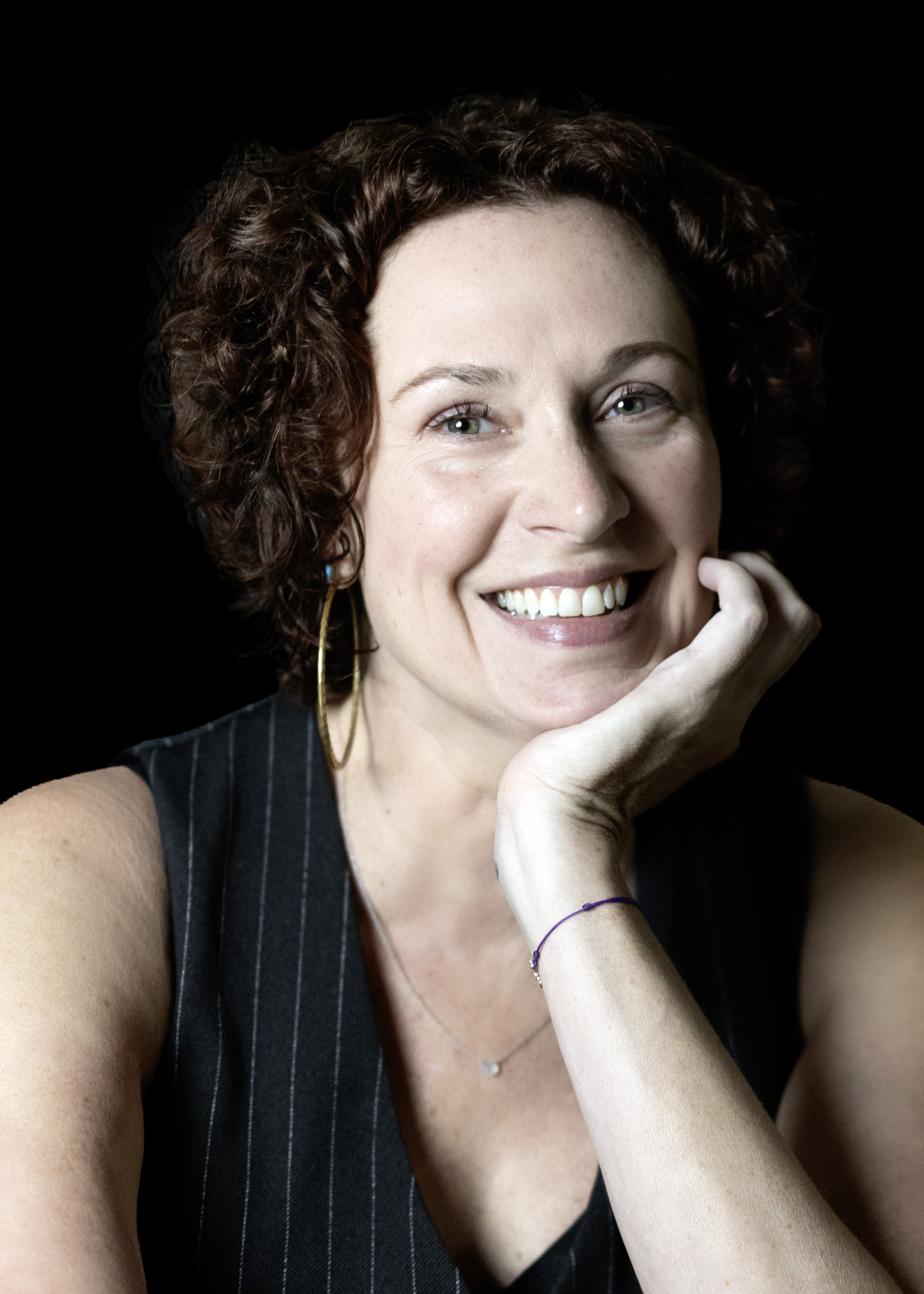
- Lacy in 2026
- Born: December 29, 1975 (age 50); Memphis, Tennessee, U.S.
- Education: Rhodes College (BA)
- Occupations: Businessperson; Former technology journalist; Author
- Awards: In 2012, Forbes named Lacy one of the top 20 most influential businesswomen in the world.

Sarah Ruth Lacy (born December 29, 1975) is an American businesswoman, former technology journalist, and author.

== Early life ==
Lacy received her B.A. in literature from Rhodes College.

== Career ==
Lacy is the former co-host of web video show Yahoo! Tech Ticker and was a columnist at BusinessWeek.

Lacy was a columnist at TechCrunch until November 19, 2011.

She is the author of 3 books: Once You're Lucky, Twice You're Good (2008), which also goes under the title The Stories of Facebook, Youtube and Myspace; Brilliant, Crazy, Cocky: How the Top 1% of Entrepreneurs Profit from Global Chaos (2011); and A Uterus Is A Feature, Not A Bug (2017).

=== PandoDaily ===
In 2012, Lacy founded technology news site PandoDaily with a reported $2.5m investment from investors including Marc Andreessen, Peter Thiel, Tony Hsieh, David Sze, Jim Breyer, Reid Hoffman, Chris Dixon and Josh Kopelman. The site consisted of a daily technology blog and a monthly event series entitled "PandoMonthly".

A series of emails from 2012 indicated Lacy was involved in a dispute regarding an event PandoDaily hosted in 2012 at event space Cross Campus in Los Angeles.

On November 17, 2014, then-Uber executive Emil Michael allegedly said Uber should consider hiring a team of opposition researchers to dig up dirt on critics in the media including Lacy, and suggested a $1 million smear campaign, after PandoDaily featured a story criticizing the misogynist practices and culture of Uber.

On October 23, 2019, Lacy sold PandoDaily to BuySellAds. Lacy cites the history of harassment, threats, and betrayals she saw and experienced in the Silicon Valley area as the reason for her exit.

=== Chairman Mom ===
Lacy co-founded Chairman Mom, a subscription-based question-and-answer forum targeted at working mothers, in April 2018.

=== Best Bookstore ===
Lacy is a co-founder, with her domestic partner Paul Carr, of The Best Bookstore, which has two locations in Palm Springs (opened 2022) and San Francisco's Union Square (opened 2025). Lacy and Carr say they think of the bookstore like a startup and hope to grow it into a large national chain.

== Recognition ==
In 2012, Forbes named Lacy one of the top 20 most influential businesswomen in the world.
