= Karen A. Smith =

New Zealand management academic

Karen Smith MNZM
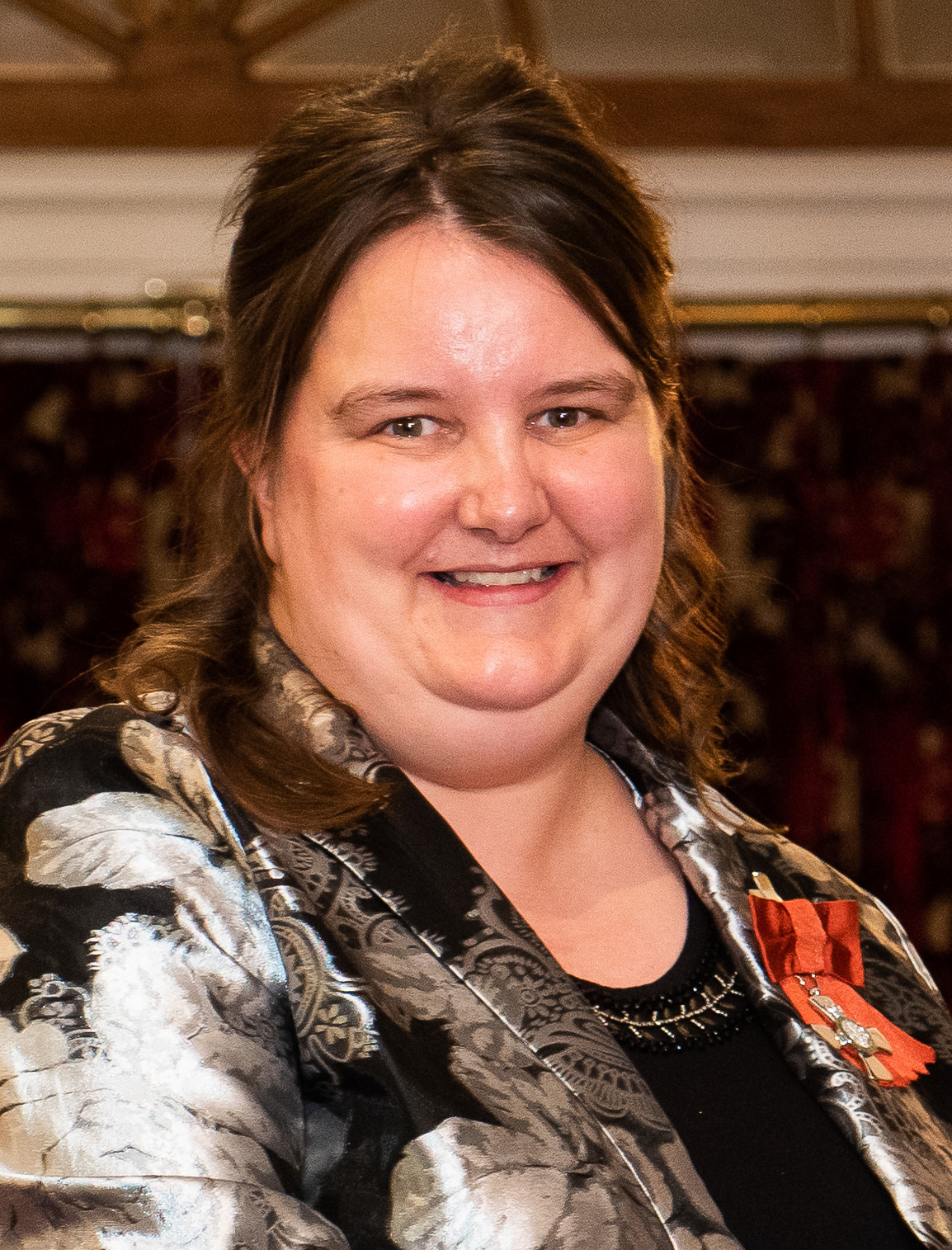
- Smith in 2019
- Education: Nottingham Trent University
- Scientific career
- Fields: management of volunteers
- Workplaces: University of Greenwich, Victoria University of Wellington
- Thesis: The management of volunteers at heritage attractions : literary heritage properties in the UK. (1999)
- Doctoral students: Heike Schänzel

Karen Alison Smith MNZM is a New Zealand management academic. She is a full professor at the Victoria University of Wellington.

== Academic career ==
Smith did a 1999 PhD thesis titled 'The management of volunteers at heritage attractions : literary heritage properties in the UK' at Nottingham Trent University, working at the University of Greenwich before moving to Victoria University of Wellington in 2003 and rising to full professor in 2017.

Smith's research focuses on the management of volunteers, particularly at large sporting events. She has conducted projects related to the Sydney 2000 Olympic Games, London 2012 Olympic Games (funded by the International Olympic Committee) and the Rugby World Cup 2011 (funded by Sport New Zealand).

In the 2019 Queen's Birthday Honours, Smith was appointed a Member of the New Zealand Order of Merit, for services to education and volunteering.

Notable doctoral students of Smith's include Heike Schänzel.

== Selected works ==
- Carl, Daniela, Sara Kindon, and Karen Smith. "Tourists' experiences of film locations: New Zealand as ‘Middle-Earth’." Tourism Geographies 9, no. 1 (2007): 49-63.
- Jones, Deborah, and Karen Smith. "Middle‐earth meets New Zealand: Authenticity and location in the making of The Lord of the Rings." Journal of management studies 42, no. 5 (2005): 923–945.
- Holmes, Kirsten, and Karen Smith. Managing volunteers in tourism. Routledge, 2012.
- Smith, Karen A., Kirsten Holmes, Debbie Haski-Leventhal, Ram A. Cnaan, Femida Handy, and Jeffrey L. Brudney. "Motivations and benefits of student volunteering: Comparing regular, occasional, and non-volunteers in five countries." Canadian journal of nonprofit and social economy research 1, no. 1 (2010): 65.
- Smith, Karen A. "Literary enthusiasts as visitors and volunteers." International Journal of Tourism Research 5, no. 2 (2003): 83–95.
