= Once You're Lucky, Twice You're Good =

Book by Sarah Lacy

Once You're Lucky, Twice You're Good - The Rebirth of Silicon Valley and the rise of web 2.0
- Original cover of Once You're Lucky, Twice You're Good
- Author: Sarah Lacy
- Language: English
- Genre: Web 2.0
- Publisher: Gotham
- Publication date: May 2008
- Publication place: United States
- Media type: Print (hardcover and paperback)
- Pages: 284
- ISBN: 1-59240-427-8

Once You're Lucky, Twice You're Good is a book written by Sarah Lacy and published in 2008. It is about some of the most successful companies of Silicon Valley and an in-depth insight into the story behind the founders, including anecdotes and other stories.
