= A Merry Little Christmas =

A Merry Little Christmas may refer to:

- A Merry Little Christmas (Linda Ronstadt album), 2000
- A Merry Little Christmas (Matt Brouwer album), 2010
- A Merry Little Christmas (Mormon Tabernacle Choir album), 2018
- A Merry Little Christmas (EP), by Lady Antebellum, 2010

== See also ==
- Have Yourself a Merry Little Christmas (disambiguation)
- "Merry Little Christmas", an episode of House
- Merry Little Christmas, an EP by Albin Lee Meldau, 2019
