= Debbie Haski-Leventhal =

Australian academic and author

Debbie Haski-Leventhal is an Australian author, a public speaker, and a Professor of Management at Macquarie Business School, Macquarie University, in Sydney, Australia. She is a scholar and teacher of corporate social responsibility (CSR) and volunteerism, with over 60 articles and six books, including Make it Meaningful. She is a TED speaker who delivers keynotes on impact, meaning, and purpose.

== Early life and career ==
According to her memoir, Make it Meaningful, Debbie Haski-Leventhal was born in Tel Aviv. Due to a family tragedy, her mother joined the Kabbalah Centre, which she claims was a cult-like organisation. Having escaped the cult at 19, she underwent a deep meaning search, leading her to study philosophy at the Hebrew University. In her TED talk, she shares how she volunteered with a child in the PERACH tutoring project, as this was the only way she could afford to obtain higher education. This experience led her to build a life as a scholar of impact and meaning, focusing on pro-social behaviour of individuals (e.g., volunteering) and companies (i.e., corporate social responsibility). She moved to Sydney, Australia in 2008, worked at the Centre for Social Impact and in 2011 moved to Macquarie University.

== Research work ==
Haski-Leventhal has published over 70 academic papers on CSR, RME, volunteering and social entrepreneurship in Human Relations, Journal of Business Ethics, MIT Sloan Management Review, NVSQ and other journals. Her work was covered many times by the media, including the New York Times and Financial Review. She is a TED speaker.

Some of Debbie Haski-Leventhal's most influential works include the Volunteer Stages and Transitions Model where she details the five phases volunteers undergo through socialisation process, and the transitions between them. This model was used in multiple studies and organisations to socialise volunteers and employees.

Furthermore, together with Lucas Meijs she developed the concepts of volunteerability (what makes a person more likely to volunteer) and recruitability (what enables organisations to recruit volunteers). Volunteerability explores what helps people to overcome the obstacles on the way to volunteering via willingness, availability, and accessibility. They also offered the CSR Congruence Model according to which companies can be placed on a CSR matrix based on their socially responsible identity and behaviour. At the same time, employees have their social responsibility (ESR) and the congruence between employees and employers could have different outcomes, challenges, and remedies.

== Publications ==
=== Books ===
- Haski-Leventhal, D. (2025). Strategic corporate social responsibility: The Holistic Approach to Impactful and Sustainable Business (3rd edition). London: SAGE Publications. Haski-Leventhal, D. (2023). Make it Meaningful: How to find purpose in life and work. Sydney: Simon & Schuster.
- Haski-Leventhal, D. (2020). The Purpose Driven University. London: Emerald Publishing.
- Haski-Leventhal, D., Roza, L., & Brammer, S. (2020). CSR and Employee Engagement. Edited book. London: SAGE Publications.
- Haski-Leventhal, D. (2018). Strategic corporate social responsibility: tools & theories for responsible management. London: SAGE Publications.

=== Most-cited publications ===
- Haski-Leventhal, D., & Bargal, D. (2008). The volunteer stages and transitions model: organizational socialization of volunteers. Human Relations, 61 (1), 67-102.
- Haski-Leventhal, D., Pournader, M., & Leigh, J. S. (2022). Responsible management education as socialization: Business students’ values, attitudes and intentions. Journal of Business Ethics, 176(1), 17-35.
- Haski-Leventhal, D., Roza, L., & Meijs, L. C. (2017). Congruence in corporate social responsibility: Connecting the identity and behavior of employers and employees. Journal of Business Ethics, 143(1), 35-51.
- Haski-Leventhal, D. (2009). Altruism and volunteerism: The perceptions of altruism in four disciplines and their impact on the study of volunteerism. Journal for the Theory of Social Behaviour, 39 (3), 271-299.
- Haski-Leventhal, D., Meijs, L., & Hustinx, L. (2010). The third-party model: Enhancing volunteering through governments, corporations and educational institutes. Journal of Social Policy, 39 (1), 139-158.
