= Heike Schänzel =

German-born New Zealand professor of tourism

- Born: 1966 (age 59–60)

Academic background
- Education: Victoria University of Wellington
- Thesis: Family Time and Own Time on Holiday: Generation, Gender, and Group Dynamic Perspectives from New Zealand (2010)
- Doctoral advisor: Douglas G. Pearce, Karen Alison Smith, Adam Weaver

Heike Annette Schänzel (born 1966) is a German–New Zealand academic, and is a full professor in the School of Hospital and Tourism at the Auckland University of Technology, specialising in research on gender and family issues in tourism.

== Academic career ==
Schänzel grew up in Germany and worked as a travel consultant, but moved to New Zealand after enjoying a motorbike touring holiday there in the 1990s. She completed a PhD titled Family Time and Own Time on Holiday: Generation, Gender, and Group Dynamic Perspectives from New Zealand at Victoria University of Wellington. Her thesis won the inaugural Dean's award in the School of Management. Schänzel then joined the faculty at Auckland University of Technology, rising to full professor from January 2024.

Schänzel's research is focused on exploring how tourism and hospitality relate to intergenerational relationships and gender. This involves looking at issues such as feminism, childism, sustainability and social justice in tourism. She has also published on the sexual politics of tourism research, and the risks for women, LGBTQ researchers and people from ethnic minorities in undertaking tourism geography fieldwork. Schänzel has co-edited six books, including Children, Families and Leisure in 2018, Tourism Education and Asia in 2019, and Masculinities in the Field: Tourism and Transdisciplinary Research in 2021. She has published forty book chapters and supervised more than thirty postgraduate theses.

Schänzel is the chief Co-editor (with Michal Apollo) of the specialty journal Social Impact of Tourism.

== Selected works ==
- Heike A. Schänzel; Alison J. McIntosh (2000). "An Insight into the Personal and Emotive Context of Wildlife Viewing at the Penguin Place, Otago Peninsula, New Zealand". Journal of Sustainable Tourism. 8 (1): 36–52. doi:10.1080/09669580008667348. Wikidata Q123455679.
- Richard S. Aquino; Michael Lück; Heike A. Schänzel (2018). "A conceptual framework of tourism social entrepreneurship for sustainable community development". Journal of Hospitality and Tourism Management. 37: 23–32. doi:10.1016/j.jhtm.2018.09.001. Wikidata Q123455648.
- Heike A. Schänzel; Ian Yeoman (2015). "Trends in family tourism". Journal of Tourism Futures. 1 (2): 141–147. doi:10.1108/jtf-12-2014-0006. Wikidata Q123455662.
- Heike A. Schänzel; Smith, Karen (2014). "The Socialization of Families Away from Home: Group Dynamics and Family Functioning on Holiday". Leisure Sciences. 36 (2): 126–143. doi:10.1080/01490400.2013.857624. Wikidata Q60512853.
- Heike A. Schänzel; Smith, Karen (2011). "The absence of fatherhood: achieving true gender scholarship in family tourism research". Annals of leisure research. 14 (2–3): 143–154. doi:10.1080/11745398.2011.615712. Wikidata Q58283700.
- Heike A. Schänzel; Smith, Karen (2011). "Photography and Children: Auto-driven Photo-elicitation". Tourism Recreation Research. 36 (1): 81–85. doi:10.1080/02508281.2011.11081664. Wikidata Q60512881.
