= Chao Guo =

American public administration scholar

Chao Guo is a public administration scholar. Currently, he is Professor of Nonprofit Management in the School of Social Policy and Practice at the University of Pennsylvania. He is also Associate Faculty Director of Fox Leadership International at Penn. His research focuses on technology and nonprofits, representation and advocacy, nonprofit governance, social entrepreneurship, and collaboration within and across the nonprofit, private, and government sectors. His research has been cited 4,371 times according to Google Scholar, with an h-index of 22 and an i10-index of 31.

== Early life and education ==
Guo attended Renmin University of China, where he received a bachelor's degree in International Relations in 1993. He then attended the University of Southern California, where he received a PhD in Public Administration in 2003.

== Career ==
Guo started his academic career in 2003 as an assistant professor at Arizona State University's the School of Community Resources and Development. In 2007 Guo moved to Department of Public Administration and Policy at the University of Georgia, where he was an assistant professor from 2007 to 2010 and a tenured associate professor from 2010 to 2012. From 2012 to 2013 Dr. Guo was a tenured Associate Professor and Director of International Programs at Indiana University's School of Public and Environmental Affairs, IUPUI. Since 2014 Guo has been associate professor at the University of Pennsylvania.

== Editorships ==
Guo is Editor-in-Chief of the journal Nonprofit & Voluntary Sector Quarterly.

== Awards and recognition ==
In 2019 Dr. Guo received the Distinguished Achievement and Service Award form the Association for Research on Nonprofit Organizations and Voluntary Action.

In 2018 Guo received the Best Conference Paper Award from the Association for Research on Nonprofit Organizations and Voluntary Action for his paper, co-authored with Chiu-Sik (Viviana) Wu, University of Pennsylvania, and Weiai Xu, University of Massachusetts - Amherst, on "The Place Dilemma of Community Foundations: ‘Equalizing’ the Inequality?"

In 2008 Guo was a recipient of the IDEA Award for research promise by the Academy of Management (Entrepreneurship Division).

== Projects ==
Guo is the Faculty Director of the Penn Restorative Entrepreneurship Program (PREP), which is designed to help formerly incarcerated persons to become entrepreneurs, participate in civic engagement, and advocate for social justice.

== Books ==
Guo, Chao, and Bielefeld, Wolfgang. (2014) Social Entrepreneurship: An Evidence-Based Approach to Creating Social Value. Wiley/Jossey-Bass.

Guo, Chao, and Saxton, Gregory D. (2020) The Quest for Attention: Nonprofit Advocacy in a Social Media Age. Stanford, CA: Stanford University Press.

== Recent Articles ==
Gazley, B., and Guo, C. (2020). “What do We Know about Nonprofit Collaboration? A Systematic Review of the Literature.” Nonprofit Management & Leadership. In press. DOI: https://doi.org/10.1002/nml.21433.

Zhang, Z., and Guo, C. (2020). “Nonprofit-Government Relations in Authoritarian China: A Review and Synthesis of the Chinese Literature.” Administration & Society. In press. DOI: https://doi.org/10.1177%2F0095399720934891.

Saxton, G.D., Ren, C., and Guo, C. (2020). “Responding to Stakeholders on Social Media: Stakeholder Salience and Firm Reactions to CSR-related Twitter Messages".” Journal of Business Ethics. In press. DOI: https://doi.org/10.1007/s10551-020-04472-x.

Zhang, Z., and Guo, C. (2020). “Together Making a Difference: A Configurational Study of Nonprofit Advocacy Effectiveness.” Public Performance & Management Review. In press. DOI: https://doi.org/10.1080/15309576.2020.1724163.

Saxton, G., and Guo, C. (2020). “Social Media Capital: Conceptualizing the Nature, Acquisition, and Expenditure of Social Media-Based Organizational Resources.” International Journal of Accounting Information Systems. In press. DOI: https://doi.org/10.1016/j.accinf.2019.100443.

Zhang, Z., and Guo, C. (2020). “Still Hold Aloft the Banner of Social Change? Nonprofit Advocacy in the Wave of Commercialization.” International Review of Administrative Sciences. In press. DOI: https://doi.org/10.1177/0020852319879979.
