= Greg Kumparak =

American blogger

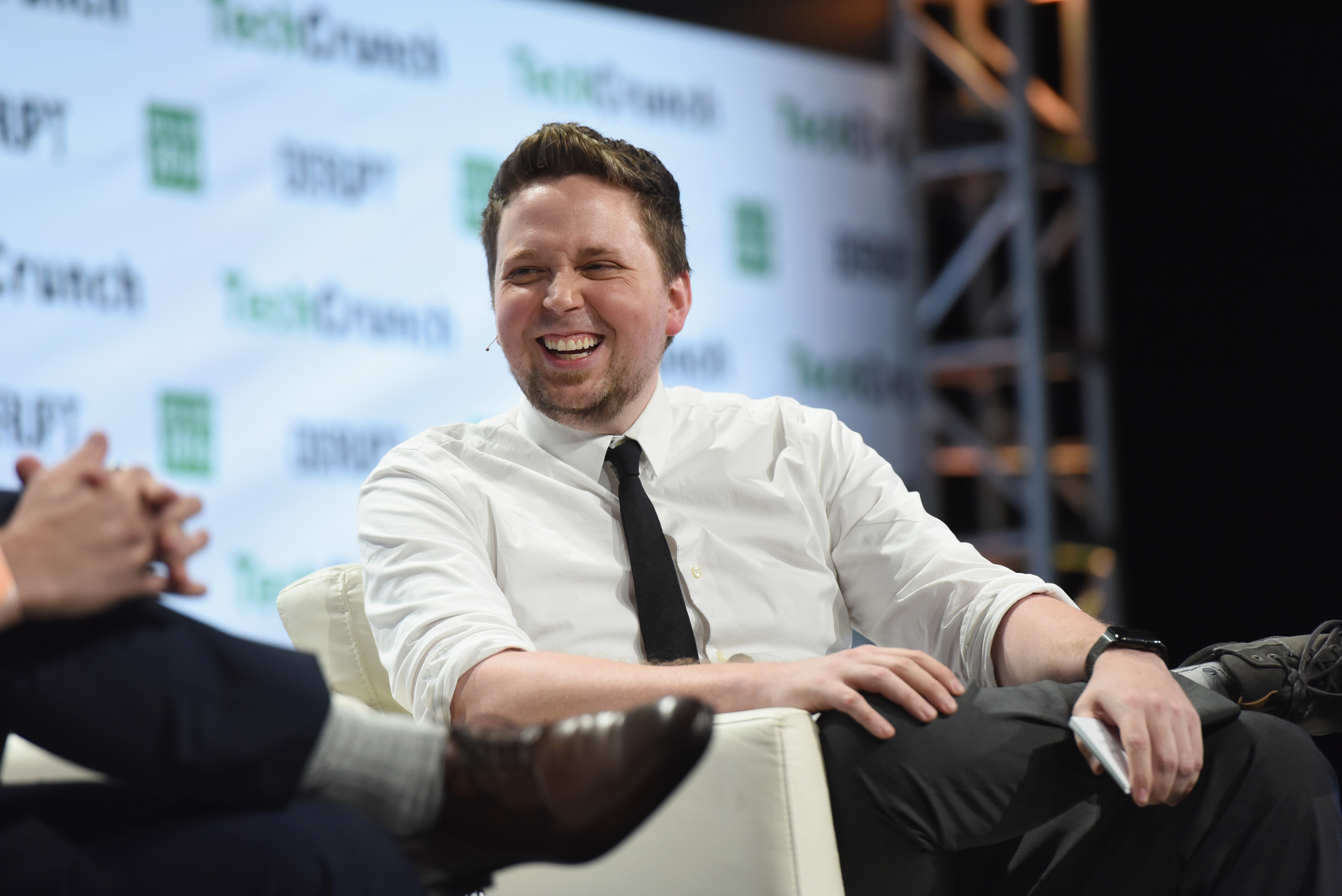
- Born: September 10, 1987 (age 39); San Luis Obispo, California, U.S.
- Occupation: Blogger
- Website: www.kumparak.com

Greg Kumparak (born September 10, 1987) is an editor at the technology news website TechCrunch. He was an early addition to TechCrunch, joining when the site was still primarily operated out of the home of its founder, Michael Arrington.

== Career ==
Prior to joining TechCrunch, Kumparak ran Heliocity, a Helio fan community primarily focused on modifying the Helio Ocean mobile device.

Kumparak joined TechCrunch in May 2008 at the age of 20. He ran TechCrunch's sister site, MobileCrunch, from 2008 to the end of 2010, when TechCrunch was acquired by AOL and the editors of its flagship sites (TechCrunch, TechCrunch UK, MobileCrunch, and CrunchGear) unified the sites under the TechCrunch brand.

As a reporter, Kumparak has broken hundreds of technology news stories, from word of ongoing venture capital deals to details of unannounced smartphones. He was an early proponent of the concept of “liveblogging”, in which an outlet covers an ongoing news event through a series of rolling textual updates.

He regularly appears on stage as an interviewer at TechCrunch's Disrupt conference, and as a judge in its regional startup pitch contests. He also appears frequently on TechCrunch's various video and podcast series, and as an occasional guest on the TechCrunch Radio show on SiriusXM.

In 2011, Kumparak found and published a method for any Facebook user to enable an early version of Facebook's then-private “Timeline” interface, which the company wouldn't publicly roll out to users until three months later.

Kumparak parted ways with TechCrunch in February 2012, but returned to the site in March 2013 at the request of newly incoming editors-in-chief, Alexia Tsotsis and Eric Eldon.

In December 2012, Kumparak published a video demonstrating a project he'd worked on in his time away from TechCrunch: the tARdis, a miniature version of the TARDIS ship from the BBC television series Doctor Who which used a bespoke augmented reality application running on a smartphone to simulate the “bigger on the inside” TARDIS interior often seen on the show. The project received international coverage from news outlets like Wired, IO9, Engadget, and the BBC itself.
