= Have Yourself a Sweary Little Christmas =

2010 album by the Amateur Transplants

Have Yourself a Sweary Little Christmas is a Christmas-themed comedy album by the Amateur Transplants. It was released on 20 December 2010.

== Production ==
The album was created by Adam Kay and Suman Biswas after their song "London underground" received several million views on YouTube in 2005. The duo began writing the songs for the album in 2009 and some of the songs from Have Yourself a Sweary Little Christmas were played in live performances by the band throughout this year. These songs also appeared on their 2009 live album In Theatre, which hit number 1 in the iTunes comedy chart. They later decided to write a full Christmas album, with the intention of releasing it before Christmas Day 2010. They were successful in doing so, and the album parodied many Christmas songs, including "Fairytale of New York" and "Do They Know It's Christmas?". The songs contain very coarse and often offensive language and lyrics; subsequently, a bleeped version was released along with the album.

== Track listing ==
1. "All I Want for Christmas" (2:37)
2. "Mucking Around on Christmas Eve" (1:53)
3. "Once in Every Carol Service" (0:33)
4. "Christmas Number 12" (1:12)
5. "It's the Most Wonderful Time of the Year" (2:17)
6. "Stressful Christmas" (0:59)
7. "Joseph's Song" (2:07)
8. "Swearytale of New York" (1:24)
9. "Stop of Canapes" (2:42)
10. "Feed the Girls" (2:01)
11. "All the Trimmings (Part 1)" (1:32)
12. "All the Trimmings (Part 2)" (2:11)
13. "Hallelujah" (8:52)
