= Roger Southam =

Roger Southam FRICS (born 29 June 1962) is a British chartered surveyor and managing agent. He appears on property and consumer TV programmes as well as in national newspapers.

== Career ==
Southam graduated from Trent Polytechnic with a bachelor's degree in Urban Estate Surveying in 1984. Having worked as an asset manager and senior development surveyor, Southam established his own company, Chainbow, in 1989, becoming chairman and chief executive. Chainbow was founded as a property investment company, specialising in shopping centre and mixed-use asset management. In 2006, it moved into residential block management.

In 2016, Southam was appointed a director in Savills Property Management team, after the company purchased Chainbow.

== Professional experience ==
Southam has been or is a panellist for leading organisations’ advisory boards and committees including:

- RICS Transparency Working Group (TWG), which examined property professionals' transparency in charging fees and commissions (see https://www.rics.org/Global/Downloads/transparency-project-consultation-document.pdf)
- Bank of England’s London Chamber of Commerce’s SME Panel, commenting and advising on economical and financial affects to small and medium enterprises
- HM Revenue & Customs’ Administrative Burdens Advisory Board, providing advice and comment on how administration can be reduced to help businesses file accounts more efficiently
- HM Revenue & Customs' Customer Experience Working Group
- Ministry of Housing, Communities and Local Government Regulation of Managing Agents Task Force, commenting on why managing agents should be regulated for the benefit of homeowners and residents.

In 1992 Southam became a Freeman of the City of London and a Liveryman and subsequently Master of the Worshipful Company of Chartered Surveyors.

He is a former chairman of the Chartered Surveyors' Training Trust, the Worshipful Company of Chartered Surveyors' Apprenticeship Scheme, which provides opportunities for 16 to 24-year-olds to form a career in the property industry (appointed 2005).

== Lobbying for leaseholder reform ==
Southam is known as a consumer and leaseholder advocate through industry and Government campaigns to license managing agents and to make them more accountable, thereby protecting the rights of homeowners and leaseholders.

Before the 2010 UK election, Southam's campaign ran alongside the work of groups such as the Campaign Against Retired Leaseholder Exploitation (CARLEX), Property Standards Board (PBS) and the Royal Institution of Chartered Surveyors (RICS).

He was appointed as non-executive chair of the government-funded Leasehold Advisory Service (LEASE) in December 2014. Since then his suitability for the role has been questioned, for example see Private Eye No 1448, 27 July 2017, page 37 "Going Southam".

In February 2017, Justin Madders MP (Labour, Ellesmere Port and Neston) questioned Mr Southam's suitability in parliament for the role.

In October 2017, Sir Peter Bottomley (Conservative, Worthing West) asked Housing Minister Alok Sharma: "Will the Minister please give serious consideration to whether the chairman of LEASE—the leasehold advisory service—can properly remain in his role, or whether it would be better to let him retire and have him replaced?"

== Media ==
Southam has been a regular columnist for London newspaper The Docklands and industry publication Shopping Centre. He has also made guest appearances on Channel Four’s Property Ladder, ITV's Tonight with Trevor McDonald, BBC News (TV), ITN and Sky News as well as BBC Radio 4’s You and Yours. Southam provides weekly comment on his own blog as well as on Property Week’s blogs.
