= Mohammed bin Jasim Alghatam =

Bahraini politician

- Arabic: محمد بن جاسم الغتم
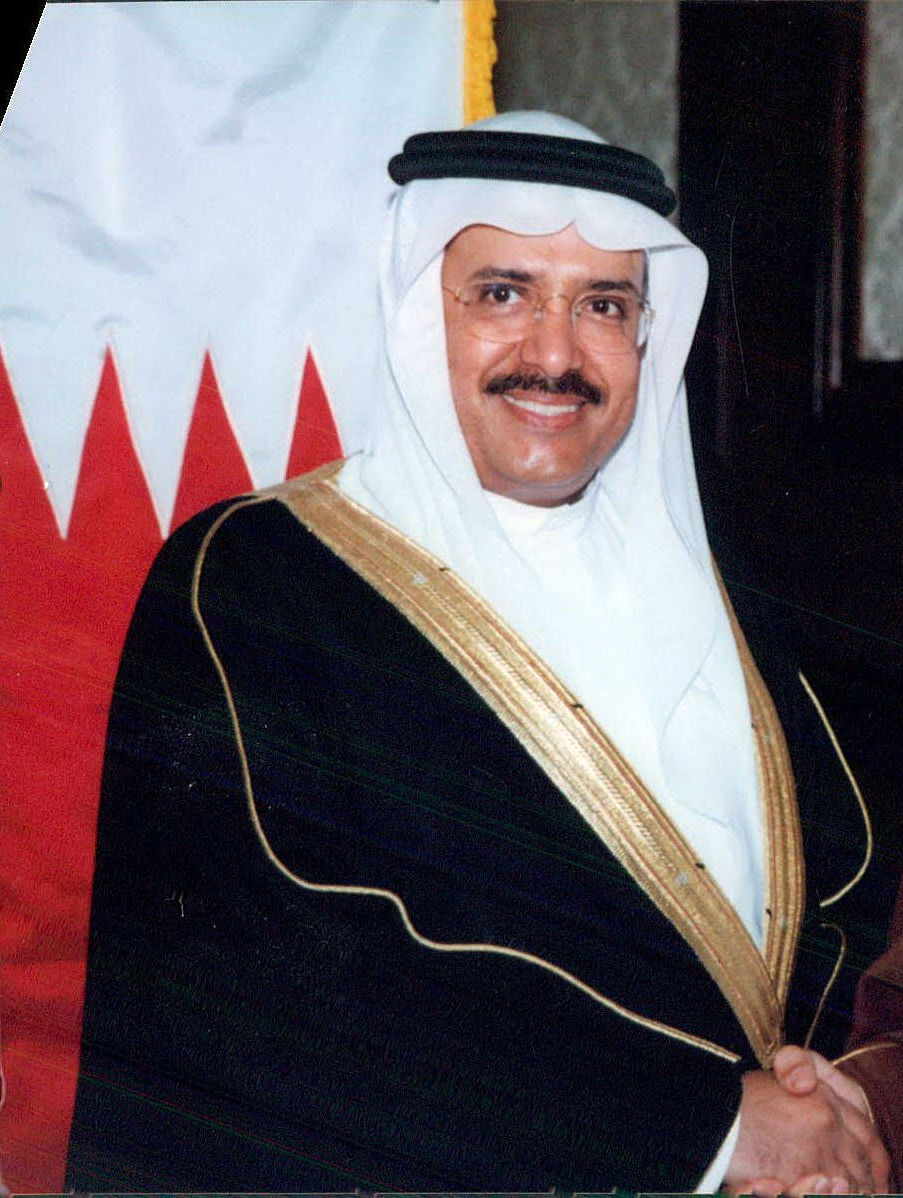

Minister of Education
- In office 2001–2002
- Preceded by: Abdulaziz bin Mohammed Al-Fadhil
- Succeeded by: Majid bin Ali Al-Nuaimi

President of The University of Bahrain
- In office 1995–2001
- Preceded by: Ibrahim Jamal al-Hashemi
- Succeeded by: Majid bin Ali Al-Nuaimi

Chairman of Aluminium Bahrain
- In office 2005–2006

Chairman of the Telecom Regulatory Authority
- In office 2002–2008

Chairman of the Bahrain Center for Studies and Research
- In office 2002–2010

Personal details
- Born: 5 May 1951 (age 75) Muharraq, Bahrain
- Education: Nottingham Trent University; Loughborough University; US Army Command & General Staff College

Military service
- Allegiance: Bahrain
- Branch/service: Bahrain Defense Force
- Years of service: 1973 - 1995
- Rank: Brigadier General

Mohammed bin Jasim Alghatam (Arabic: محمد بن جاسم الغتم) is a Bahraini politician, engineer, and army veteran. He has held various significant roles, including president of the University of Bahrain and Minister of Education of Bahrain.

== Life and education ==
Born in Muharraq in 1951, Alghatam pursued an extensive educational journey. Starting with twelve certificates and diplomas in mechanical and electrical engineering from Gulf Technical College, Derby College of Art and Technology, and the University of London, he went on to acquire a BSc in Mechanical Engineering from Nottingham Trent University. His MSc from Loughborough University in the UK delved into the numerical computer analysis of stress, fluid flow, and heat transfer. He further earned a Ph.D. in Computer-Simulated Energy from the same institution. His military education includes a Master of Military Art and Science (MMAS) and a Command and General Staff Diploma, both obtained from the United States Army Command and General Staff College at Fort Leavenworth, US.

== Professional career ==
Alghatam's career has spanned various industrial sectors, starting as an engineer at the Bahrain Petroleum Company (BAPCO) between 1969 and 1971, followed by a role as chief engineer at Aluminium Bahrain (ALBA) from 1971 to 1973. He then dedicated over two decades, from 1973 to 1995, as the director of technical affairs at the Bahrain Defence Force (BDF). His leadership capabilities were highlighted as he held the position of president at the University of Bahrain from 1995 to 2001 and the minister of education from 2001 to 2002. He also played significant roles in Bahrain's industrial and telecommunication sectors, serving as chairman of the board of directors for both Aluminium Bahrain (ALBA) and the Telecommunications Regulatory Authority (TRA). Additionally, he chaired the board of trustees at the Bahrain Centre for Studies and Research (BCSR) from 2002 to 2010.

== Professional affiliations and memberships ==
Alghatam is a Chartered Engineer with the U.K. Engineering Council since 1985 and a member of the American Society of Mechanical Engineers since 1986. He has also been associated with various boards and committees, such as the Economic Development Board, the board of trustees of both Shaikh Isa Cultural Centre and the Arabian Gulf University, and the Supreme Committee for drafting the Bahrain National Charter, among others.

- Member of the Economic Development Board
- Member of the board of trustees, Shaikh Isa Cultural Centre
- Member of the board of trustees, Yusuf Bin Ahmed Kanoo Award
- Chairman of the Eisenhower Fellowship Committee in Bahrain
- Member of the Supreme Committee for drafting the Bahrain National Charter
- Member of Supreme Council for Vocational Training in Bahrain
- Member of the board of trustees of the Arabian Gulf University
- Member of the Higher Education Council for the Arab Education Bureau for Gulf States
- Member of the board of trustees of the Bahrain-British Foundation
- Member of the board of World Renewable Energy Congress
- President of the UNESCO National Commission of Bahrain

== Awards and recognition ==
Alghatam has received numerous awards and recognitions. These include seven military decorations and medals, such as the Military Competence Medal, Bahrain Medal, and Kuwait Liberation Medal. His dedication to engineering research was acknowledged with the Crown Prince’s Prize. In recognition of his vast contributions, France conferred upon him the titles of Knight and subsequently Commander of the Legion of Honour. He also holds an honorary Doctor of Science degree from Loughborough University, awarded in 2002.

Alghatam received the Prime Minister’s Award for Muharraq Pioneers. He is the holder of the Order of Military efficiency, the Order of Bahrain, and the Order of the Liberation of Kuwait, the Kuwait Liberation Medal of the Order of Military Service, and the Order of Shaikh Isa bin Salman al Khalifa. He was also given the State Prize for Outstanding National Work.

- Military Competence Medal
- Bahrain Medal
- Kuwait Liberation Medal
- Kuwait Liberation Decoration
- Military Service Medal
- Sheikh Isa Bin Salman Al Khalifa Medal
- The Prime Minister's award for Muharraq Pioneers
- H.H. the Crown Prince Prize for Engineering Research
- State Recognition Prize for Distinguished National Achievements
- Four times honored in the Bahrain National Scholar Day
- Honorary Degree of Doctor of Science (D.Sc.), Loughborough University, United Kingdom
- The French Knight of the Legion of Honor Order
- The French Commander of the Legion of Honor Order
- Honorary Membership of the Moroccan Historian Society

== Publications ==
Alghatam has authored several scholarly articles and books, focusing on development strategies for Bahrain and the Middle East. His publications range from investigations using the finite element method to strategic outlooks on the Kingdom of Bahrain in an international context.

- Alghatam, M.J. and Cubitt, N.J. (1979). An investigation into the use of the finite element method for certain continuum problems. Unpublished MSC Thesis, University of Technology, Loughborough, Leics, England, UJK.
- Alghatam, M.J. (1985). Solar ventilation and air-conditioning system investigation using the finite element method (Doctoral dissertation, Loughborough University).
- Alghatam, M.J. (1987). Solar-powered air-conditioning system investigation using the finite element method. Solar & wind technology, 4(3), pp. 243–268.
- Alghatam, M.J. (1991). Finite element analysis of laser-induced damage to mechanically loaded laminated composites in helicopters. ARMY COMMAND AND GENERAL STAFF COLL FORT LEAVENWORTH KS.
- Alghatam, M.J. (2003). "A strategic view of the Kingdom of Bahrain and the Arab region in an international context." ISBN 99901-04-52-2
- Alghatam, M.J. (2004). "A strategic look at the Kingdom of Bahrain and the Arab region in an international context, book two." ISBN 99901-04-52-2
- Alghatam, M.J. (2007). "A strategic view of the Kingdom of Bahrain and the Arab region within an international framework, Book Four." ISBN 978-99901-09-68-9
- Alghatam, M.J. and Ǧalāl, M.N. (2007). Arab and Muslim issues in a changing world. Bahrain Centre for Studies & Research.
- Alghatam, M.J. (2008). "Islamic banks, theory, practice and future prospects."
- Alghatam, M.J. (2008). "A strategic view of the Kingdom of Bahrain and the Arab region within an international framework, book five." ISBN 978-99901-09-78-8
- Alghatam, M.J. (2010). "A strategic vision for the development of Bahraini society." ISBN 978-99901-09-87-0
- Al-Ghatam, M.J., Al-Sadiq, A., and Galal, M.N. (2010). Bahrain Strategic Report II. Manama: Bahrain Centre for Studies and Research.
- Developmental Strategies And Improvements Policies
- A Vision And An Experience In Education Reform
- Strategic International Vision At Kingdom Of Bahrain And The Arabian Peninsula

== Private life ==
Alghatam is married and has six children.
