= Adam Leventhal =

English TV presenter (born 1979)

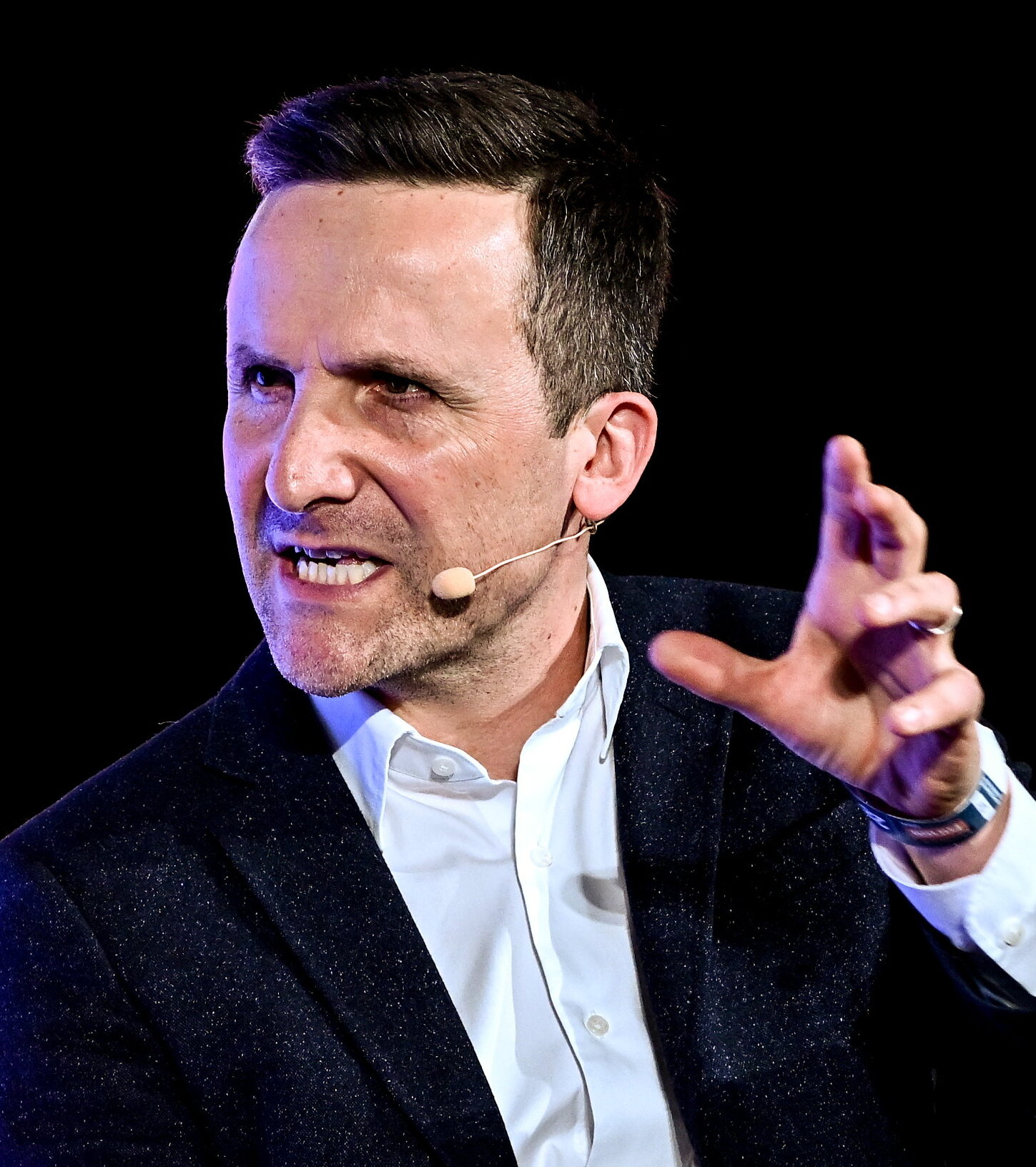
Leventhal in 2024

Adam Leventhal (born 13 November 1979, in London) is an English broadcaster, television presenter and journalist.

== Radio ==
His career began in 1995 at Capital Radio, London working on the award-winning Capital Gold Sportstime, initially in production and editing before moving into broadcasting. He spent 8 years at Capital covering FIFA World Cup, UEFA Euro, UEFA Champions League, Premier League and Wimbledon Championships.

In 2002, he worked for Arsenal F.C., commentating and reporting on every home and away domestic and European match.

== Television ==
In 2003 he joined Sky Sports News as reporter. In 2006, he started a specialist cricket correspondent role, covering tours and tournaments in India, the West Indies, Sri Lanka, Australia and South Africa.

On tour he reported on major news stories, including the death of Bob Woolmer at the Cricket World Cup in 2007 and the Mumbai terrorist attacks in 2008.

In 2010 he became a presenter on Sky Sports News.

== Digital Publishing & Audio Documentaries ==
In 2019 he joined The Athletic. He won best audio documentary awards in 2022 (Kanjuruhan Stadium Disaster in Indonesia) and 2023 (Turkey Earthquakes "Football on the Fault Line" coverage) at the British Sports Journalism Awards.

== Music Radio ==
Leventhal presented and produced radio programmes on the Emap network (Kiss 100 London and Radio Aire Leeds) and also Ministry of Sound Radio. At Nottingham Trent University - where he studied Broadcast Journalism - he won two BBC Student Radio Awards in consecutive years for 'Best Show' and 'Best Specialist Music Programme'.
