= Dai Roberts =

British sculptor, print and installation artist

- Education: Nottingham Trent University, Chelsea College of Art
- Known for: Conceptual art, installation art
- Notable work: IAO, UNIT, Untitled as Yet I can not believe we are having this talk again Mr Roberts
- Awards: Marmite Painting Prize - winner 2008

Dai Roberts is a British sculptor, print and installation artist. He taught at Coventry University, and was teaching at Richmond University in 2011.
