= Malik Noor Saleem Khan =

Pakistani politician

MPA Malik Noor Saleem Khan

Member of the Provincial Assembly of Khyber Pakhtunkhwa
- In office 31 May 2013 – 28 May 2018
- Constituency: PK-75 (Lakki Marwat-II)

Personal details
- Born: 9 March 1972 (age 54) Karachi
- Party: Jamiat Ulema-e-Islam (F)
- Education: Nottingham Trent University; Boston University
- Occupation: Politician

Malik Noor Saleem Khan (born 9 March 1972) is a Pakistani politician from Lakki Marwat District who was a member of the Khyber Pakhtunkhwa Assembly from 2013 to 2018. He belongs to the Jamiat Ulema-e-Islam (F). He also served as chairman and member of the different committees.

== Early life and education ==
Khan was born on 9 March 1972 in Karachi, he got his BSc degree in Business studies from Nottingham Trent University and Master of Business Administration from Boston University.

== Political career ==
Khan was elected as the member of the Khyber Pakhtunkhwa Assembly on ticket of Jamiat Ulema-e-Islam (F) from PK-75 (Lakki Marwat-II) in the 2013 Pakistani general election.
