= Association for Research on Nonprofit Organizations and Voluntary Action =

Forum for researchers

- Formation: 1971
- Founder: David Horton Smith
- Type: 501(c)(3) Public Charity
- Tax ID no.: 23-7378021
- Location: Indianapolis, Indiana
- Key people: Burt R. Baldwin; Richard D. Reddy; Eugene D. White Jr.
- Affiliations: American Council of Learned Societies
- Website: ARNOVA

The Association for Research on Nonprofit Organizations and Voluntary Action (ARNOVA) was founded and incorporated in 1971 by David Horton Smith, with the help of Burt R. Baldwin, Richard D. Reddy, and Eugene D. White Jr. as the Association for Voluntary Action Scholars (AVAS).

As of 2022 the President of ARNOVA was Chao Guo.

== History ==
The vision of the founders was to create an independent and impartial forum for researchers in the fledgling field of voluntary action and citizen participation. For a long time, AVAS’ annual conferences and quarterly journal were the only outlets available to scholars interested in this area of research.

AVAS originally held parallel conferences with the Association for Volunteer Administration and the Association of Volunteer Bureaus. The first conference was held in Denver, Colorado in 1974. The first solo conference was held in 1982 in Lansing, Michigan. These annual conventions allowed the organization to fulfill its purpose, as stated in the by-laws, to "stimulate, coordinate, and otherwise aid the efforts of those engaged in research, other scholarship and professional activity related to the understanding and improvement of nonprofit organizations and voluntary action" by creating a face-to-face forum for idea exchange.

AVAS’ publications were a major part of its contribution to the research community. The newsletter begun in 1973 and contained information about events and individuals in the research community as well as information specific to the organization. Citizen Participation and Voluntary Action Abstracts appeared originally as a supplement to the first newsletter, bringing together a variety of resources for researchers working in this interdisciplinary field. Volunteer Administration was published by AVAS until 1982, and is now published by the Association of Volunteer Administrators as the Journal of Volunteer Administration. The Journal of Voluntary Action Research (JVAR) begun in 1972 and was, for a long time, the only scholarly journal focusing on all aspects of voluntary action research. In 1986 JVAR attempted to broaden its focus to include the rapidly growing field of nonprofit study by adding a subtitle: Studies of Voluntarism, Citizen Participation, Philanthropy, and Nonprofit Organizations. 1988 heralded a new publisher for the journal, and an entirely new name- Nonprofit and Voluntary Sector Quarterly (NVSQ). More recently, the organization has collaborated with the Indiana University Center on Philanthropy on Research in Progress.

ARNOVA's executive office moved from its original home at Boston College to Pennsylvania State University, and then again to the Lincoln Filene Center at Tufts University in 1986. In 1990 the office moved again to become loosely affiliated with the Department of Adult and Youth Education at Washington State University. Continuing financial problems and low membership throughout the 1980s caused Delwyn A. Dyer to convene a Strategic Planning Committee in 1988. Following the committee's recommendation, the board of directors voted to change the organization's name from the narrowly focused Association for Voluntary Action Scholars to the more inclusive Association of Researchers on Nonprofit Organizations and Voluntary Action (ARNOVA).

The planning process continued at a retreat on February 8–10, 1991, in Corpus Christi, Texas. Board members focused on the need to upgrade the association's services, enhance its reputation, and reach out to include a diverse, interdisciplinary group of researchers and practitioners interested in voluntary action and nonprofit study. Following the retreat, Kirsten Gronbjerg (co-president 1993-1994) prepared a document stating ARNOVA's goals to present to possible funders.

A second retreat was held at lifetime member David Mason's ranch on March 19–21, 1993. Decisions made at the Mason Ranch Retreat resulted in the formalization of ARNOVA's relationships with Independent Sector and the academic centers, and the affiliation of NVSQ with the Program on Non-Profit Organizations (PONPO) at Yale University and the executive office with the Indiana University Center on Philanthropy in 1994. These affiliations strengthened ARNOVA's position as a research organization. Consequent funding from the Ford Foundation and the Kellogg Foundation gave the organization the wherewithal to become the "interdisciplinary fellowship of scholars" its founders had envisioned.

== Works or publications ==
- Association for Research on Nonprofit Organizations and Voluntary Action (2001). Philanthropy in communities of color : traditions and challenges. Indianapolis, IN: Association for Research on Nonprofit Organizations and Voluntary Action. OCLC 607531122.
- Nonprofit and voluntary sector quarterly : journal of the Association for Research on Nonprofit Organizations and Voluntary Action. London: Sage Publ. 1999. OCLC 174542978.
- Association of Voluntary Action Scholars (U.S.); Association for Research on Nonprofit Organizations and Voluntary Action (1989). Nonprofit and voluntary sector quarterly. San Francisco, CA: Jossey Bass. OCLC 953640968.

== See also ==
- Association of Fundraising Professionals
- Association of Leaders in Volunteer Engagement (ALIVE)
- Community engagement
- European Volunteer Centre (CEV)
- International Association for Volunteer Effort (IAVE)
- International Council for Voluntary Agencies (ICVA)
- Philanthropy in the United States
- Society for Human Resource Management (SHRM)
