= Paul Bradley Carr =

British writer, journalist & commentator (born 1979)

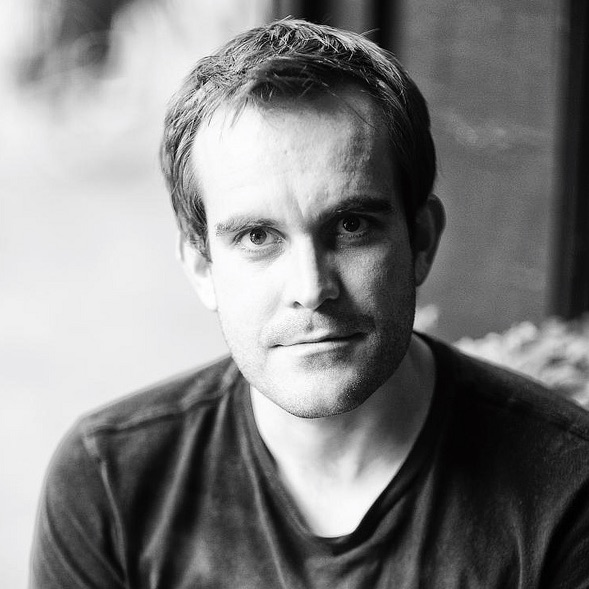
- Born: 7 December 1979 (age 46); Dunfermline, Scotland
- Citizenship: United Kingdom; United States (since 2024)
- Education: Nottingham Law School
- Occupation: Writer
- Writing career
- Pen name: Paul Carr
- Notable works: The Confessions, 1414°
- Website: paulbradleycarr.com

Paul Bradley Carr (born 7 December 1979) is a British-American writer, journalist and commentator, based in San Francisco. He has also—as he wrote on his official website—"edited various publications and founded numerous businesses with varying degrees of abysmal failure."

== Fiction ==
In 2021, Carr published his first novel, 1414°, a satirical thriller set in Silicon Valley. The novel received a starred review from Publishers Weekly which compared the book to Michael Crichton's Disclosure. The audiobook of 1414°, narrated by Emily Lawrence, was released in 2022.

In 2024, it was reported that Carr's next novel, The Confessions, had been sold to Atria in a "six-figure deal." The novel subsequently received a starred review from Library Journal and was one of The Guardian's "Best Thrillers of 2025". In 2025, it was announced that Faber & Faber would be publishing The Confessions in the UK.

== Memoirs ==
Carr's first autobiographical book, Bringing Nothing to the Party—True Confessions of a New Media Whore, was published by Weidenfeld & Nicolson in 2008. It tells the story of "a unique group of hard-partying, high-achieving young entrepreneurs—and [Carr's] attempts to join them, whatever the cost." According to one review, the book follows Carr's "journey from gonzo journalist, to accidental business owner, to accidental web business mogul, to very-near-jailbird, to working out what actually makes him happy in life."

Weidenfeld & Nicolson published a second book by Carr in May 2011, titled The Upgrade. The book describes Carr's physical travels to the United States and other countries, including Spain, France, Germany, Canada and Iceland, as well as his personal journey, documenting Carr's battles with alcohol and subsequent attempt to give up drinking. In 2011 it was reported that the movie rights for The Upgrade had been purchased by Neon Park

In March and April 2011, Carr spent 33 days staying on the Las Vegas Strip, spending each night in a different hotel. He wrote about his experiences for the Huffington Post and later in a book titled We'll Always Have The Flamingo.

In March 2012 The New York Daily News reported that Byliner was publishing a new memoir by Carr, titled Sober Is My New Drunk. In an extract from the book published in The Wall Street Journal and titled "How I Stopped Drowning in Drink," Carr explained his realization that he was an alcoholic and his successful self-designed program to stop drinking.

== Satirical writing ==
In 2001, while studying law at university, Carr co-founded and edited the award-winning satirical "comment sheet," The Friday Thing.

In 2002, The Christian Scientist described Carr as a "latter day Jonathan Swift" following the publication of his satirical anti-vigilante manifesto "Think of the Children." In the same year, Carr co-founded the London city guide, London by London.

He has also written for television, most recently for Alison Jackson's Doubletake series.

== New Media writing ==
In July 2009 it was announced that Carr would be writing a weekly column for technology news site TechCrunch and also blogging regularly for The Telegraph newspaper. On 16 September 2011, Carr announced on TechCrunch that he was resigning from the AOL-owned properties. His byline has since been stripped from his articles, listing him only as "Contributor"

Prior to joining TechCrunch, Carr wrote a weekly column for The Guardian newspaper entitled "Not Safe For Work" which followed his adventures in the technology industry. Between 2003 and 2005 he wrote a regular new media column for Media Guardian.

Carr has also authored a series of nine web guide books for Prentice Hall, as well as co-authoring The Unofficial Tourists' Guide to Second Life published by Pan Macmillan (UK) and St Martin's Press (US) in 2007.

Carr was a regular user of Twitter, but deleted his account in August 2010 to focus on blogging. Carr resumed using Twitter in April 2011 before quitting again in May 2015.

Between 2014 and 2019 Carr served as editorial director of PandoDaily where he wrote a daily column.

In 2020, Business Insider reported that Carr was launching Techworker.com, an independent news site for and about those who work in the technology industry.

== Entrepreneurship ==
In 2005, along with Clare Christian, Carr co-founded The Friday Project, a book publishing house specializing in finding material on the web and then turning it into traditional books.

Carr left The Friday Project in December 2006, along with online editor Karl Webster, to lead a buy-out of the company's Internet media arm, which led to the founding of online city site Fridaycities.com. Carr left Fridaycities in 2007, when the site re-branded as Kudocities. He later described himself as "NSFW" (Not Safe For Work).

In September 2011, having publicly resigned from TechCrunch following the departure of founder Michael Arrington, it was reported that Carr planned to return to entrepreneurship. One month later, Carr announced the launch of Not Safe For Work Corporation, an online satirical news weekly. The company was reportedly backed by investments from Zappos CEO Tony Hsieh and Arrington's CrunchFund.

Not Safe For Work Corporation, or "NSFWCORP", failed financially and was sold to technology news Web site PandoDaily which was founded by Sarah Lacy and also funded by Hsieh alongside Marc Andreessen and Peter Thiel.

In 2017, Re/Code reported that Carr and Sarah Lacy were co-founding a new company, Chairman Mom. In 2018, Business Insider reported that the company had raised $1.4m in venture capital.

== Bibliography ==
=== Fiction ===
- 1414° (2021)
- The Confessions (2025)

=== Memoirs ===
- We'll Always Have The Flamingo (2012)
- Sober Is My New Drunk (2012)
- The Upgrade (2011)
- Bringing Nothing to the Party (2008)
