= Amateur Transplants =

Comedy musical group

- Origin: London, England
- Genres: Parody, comedy
- Years active: 2002–2016
- Label: Independent
- Past members: Adam Kay; Suman Biswas

Amateur Transplants were a parody music band fronted by London-based, British comedian Adam Kay and Suman Biswas (born 1978). Amateur Transplants came to prominence in 2004 with a profanity-laden rant song about the London Underground, parodying the Jam song "Going Underground". They regularly performed live, and have been recommended by Time Out, including several successful years at the Edinburgh Festival Fringe. The band's final performance was in Reading in May 2016.

== Music and biography ==
Their music primarily consists of parody comic songs mostly dealing with medical subjects. A few of their parodies are based on the works of American comedic songwriter Tom Lehrer. They performed at the Edinburgh Festival Fringe every year for several years from 2005 and Adam Kay performed at Latitude 2012. Ten percent of their sales, and all proceeds from the London Underground Song are donated to Macmillan Cancer Relief. The duo have released three studio albums, Fitness to Practice, Unfit to Practise and Have Yourself a Sweary Little Christmas. They also released an album of a live recording of their stage show called In Theatre. Their song Anaesthetist's Hymn was featured in Geek Pop 2008.

The band's most famous track "London Underground", along with its accompanying flash animation, was a popular internet fad in the UK in 2004 and 2005. It is set to the tune of "Going Underground" by The Jam and criticises the London Underground strike of the time. It was released as part of their first album, and a newly recorded version with a rock music accompaniment was included in Unfit to Practise, as well as being released as a single on the iTunes Store, reaching number one on the 'Comedy' chart having been downloaded over 4 million times.

Both Kay and Biswas studied medicine at Imperial College London. Their songs "Snippets" and "Careless Surgeon" ridicule those who study medicine at rival London medical schools King's College London and Barts respectively. "Always Look on the Bright Side of Life", the final song of their first album, ridicules most of the other London medical schools.

The band's official website stated that "Locum Amateur Transplant Suman Biswas appeared with Adam for a few years, but is now back to healing the sick and lame". Biswas works full-time in the NHS as an anaesthetist and in 2013 released a solo album entitled Still Alive after Amateur Transplants.

== Discography ==
- 2004 – Fitness to Practice
- 2007 – The Black and White Menstrual Show (DVD of performance)
- 2008 – Unfit to Practise
- 2009 – In Theatre (Live recorded album)
- 2010 – Have Yourself a Sweary Little Christmas
- 2013 – Specimens
- 2016 – The Remains of Tom Lehrer

== Tours ==
Amateur Transplants toured the UK in 2007 with "The Black and White Menstrual Show" which resulted in their first DVD.

In 2010 the duo toured the UK with the "Amateur Transplants in Theatre" show leading to the live album of the same name.

In October 2011 the duo toured Trondheim, Norway, and performed at Rockheim during Frampeik, an annual conference for Norwegian medical students.

During 2012, Adam Kay toured Britain under the title "From Amateur Transplants: Adam Kay's Smutty Songs".
