= Deep Blue Something =

American rock band

- Also known as: Leper Messiah
- Origin: Denton, Texas, U.S.
- Genres: Alternative rock, pop rock
- Years active: 1991–2001, 2014–present
- Labels: Interscope, Aezra, Kirtland, Flatiron
- Members: Clay Bergus; John Kirtland; Toby Pipes; Todd Pipes; Kirk Tatom
- Website: deepbluesomethingofficial.com

Deep Blue Something are an American rock band, known for the 1995 hit single "Breakfast at Tiffany's" from their second album, Home. Home achieved gold-record status; however, the band parted ways with Interscope Records and went on creative hiatus for several years, only releasing the follow-up Byzantium in Japan and some European countries. They eventually signed with the Aezra label and released Deep Blue Something in 2001, breaking up shortly after. The band regrouped with all members at the end of 2014 and signed to drummer John Kirtland's independent label, Kirtland Records.

== History ==
The group was founded in 1991 in Denton, Texas, by brothers Todd and Toby Pipes, then students at the University of North Texas. The brothers enlisted drummer John Kirtland and guitarist Clay Bergus. Deep Blue Something originally performed as Leper Messiah, after the line from David Bowie's "Ziggy Stardust".

Bergus left the band before the band started recording their first album, 11th Song. The band independently released the album in 1993. Kirk Tatom joined the band after the album's release. In 1994, the band released their second album, Home, via an independent label named RainMaker Records. Home was re-released a year later by major label Interscope Records. The accompanying single "Breakfast at Tiffany's" peaked at number five on the Billboard Hot 100 and topped the charts in the United Kingdom. According to Todd Pipes, the lyrics of the song were inspired by Audrey Hepburn's performance in the feature film Roman Holiday, but he thought that the Hepburn film Breakfast at Tiffany's would make a better song title.

The huge success of the single and lack of follow-up activity led to their classification as a one-hit-wonder band within music circles. In late 1995, Tatom left the band and Bergus returned to his role as guitarist. The band worked on their third album, titled Byzantium, with a planned release in 1996. However, Deep Blue Something came into legal troubles over the copyright of 11th Song and "Breakfast at Tiffany's". Although the lawsuits were finally settled, Interscope put the album on hold, focusing on other label artists such as Limp Bizkit. Interscope eventually released the album in 1998, but only in Japan.

The band then sued Interscope and won a release from their contract. They later signed with Aezra Records, an independent label based in Phoenix, Arizona. Their self-titled album, which contains five tracks from Byzantium, was released by Aezra in 2001. Shortly after the album's release, the band "drifted apart," and its members worked on separate projects for over a decade.

In 2014, Todd Pipes posted an Instagram photo teasing that the band was back together and working on a new project, eventually revealed to be an EP titled Locust House. The EP was released as a digital download on June 29, 2015.

== Other activities of band members ==
Todd and Toby Pipes have become producers for Flickerstick, Demp, Calhoun, the Greater Good, Coma Rally, Moonshot Radio, Porter Block, and The Nadas. They have earned Best Producer honors from the Fort Worth Weekly three years in a row and have had their production work highlighted in Mix Magazine.

Todd Pipes (born November 9, 1967), has released a solo album, Taurus Petals, on Authentic Records. It was released on November 25, 2008. Later on he released an EP, Polar Patterns, on Idol Records. It was released on September 25, 2012. He released an EP "Mainsail To Skyking" on Idol Records. It was released on August 3, 2018.

Toby Pipes (born June 28, 1971), formed the band The Hundred Inevitables, with Jeff Whittington and released an album, Studder, in early 2000. In 2005, he formed a new band Little Black Dress with Nolan Thies. In 2009 they were the first band signed onto Exploding Plastic Records, a new Idol Records sub-label. Their debut album, Snow in June, was released June 2009. In 2010, a new Hundred Inevitables album, Decade of Downtime, was released. As of 2025, Toby Pipes is listed as Music Industry Relations Coordinator at Texas A&M University.

John Kirtland runs an independent record label, Kirtland Records. Based in Dallas, Texas, and Los Angeles, California, Kirtland's business dealings led to his ownership of the back-catalog of the band Bush and royalty rights on the sales of certain albums by the band No Doubt. Kirtland quickly sold off his rights to the No Doubt material, but retained the rights to the Bush back catalog until 2014, when they were sold to a consortium that included Bush frontman Gavin Rossdale. However, Kirtland Records continues to feature Texas-based indie bands such the Burden Brothers, The Polyphonic Spree and Toadies, and was the issuing label for Deep Blue Something's 2015 EP, Locust House.

Clay Bergus has been a manager at Eddie V's Prime Seafood in Fort Worth since its opening in spring 2009.

Kirk Tatom formed an acoustic duo with fellow Texas musician Greg Beutel, performing under the name Whiskey Pants.

== Personnel ==
In alphabetical order

- Clay Bergus – guitar, backing vocals (1991–1992, 1995–2001, 2014–present)
- John Kirtland – drums, percussion (1991–2001, 2014–present)
- Toby Pipes – guitar, backing and occasional lead vocals (1991–2001, 2014–present)
- Todd Pipes – lead vocals, bass (1991–2001, 2014–present)
- Kirk Tatom – guitar, backing vocals (1993–1995, 2014–present)

== Discography ==
=== Studio albums ===
Title	Details	Peak chart positions								Certifications (sales threshold)
Title	Details	US	AUS	AUT	GER	NL	SWE	SWI	UK	Certifications (sales threshold)
11th Song	Release date: October 13, 1993; Label: Doberman Records; Formats: CD	—	—	—	—	—	—	—	—	
Home	Release date: October 24, 1994; Re-release: June 13, 1995; Label: RainMaker Records, Interscope Records (re-release); Formats: CD, cassette	46	31	32	16	26	39	20	24	US: Gold
Byzantium	Release date: November 13, 1998; Label: Interscope Records; Formats: CD	—	—	—	—	—	—	—	—	
Deep Blue Something	Release date: December 10, 2001; Label: Aezra Records; Formats: CD	—	—	—	—	—	—	—	—	
Lunar Phase	Release date: June 20, 2025; Label: Flatiron Recordings; Formats: CD, vinyl, music download	—	—	—	—	—	—	—	—	
"—" denotes releases that did not chart

=== Extended plays ===
Title	Album details
Locust House	Released: June 29, 2015; Label: Kirtland Records; Formats: Digital download

=== Singles ===
Year/Date	Single	Peak chart positions									Certifications	Album
Year/Date	Single	US	AUS	AUT	GER	NL	NZ	SWE	SWI	UK	Certifications	Album
1995	"Breakfast at Tiffany's"	5	3	12	6	11	21	9	19	1	BPI: 2× Platinum; BVMI: Gold; RMNZ: 2× Platinum	Home
1996	"Halo"	102^{[+]}	—	—	—	—	—	—	—	—		Home
1996	"Josey"	—	—	—	—	—	—	—	—	27		Home
1998	"She Is"	—	—	—	—	—	—	—	—	—		Byzantium
2001	"Page Me Wolverine"	—	—	—	—	—	—	—	—	—		Deep Blue Something
2001	"Hell in Itself"	—	—	—	—	—	—	—	—	—		Deep Blue Something (originally from Byzantium)
2001	"Who Wants It"	—	—	—	—	—	—	—	—	—		Deep Blue Something
2015	"All Make Believe Off"	—	—	—	—	—	—	—	—	—		Locust House
2015	"Out of My Head"	—	—	—	—	—	—	—	—	—		Locust House
2020	"Hide"	—	—	—	—	—	—	—	—	—		Lunar Phase
2020	"Don't Stop"	—	—	—	—	—	—	—	—	—		Lunar Phase
2022	"Cherry Lime Rickey" (re-recording, later de-listed)	—	—	—	—	—	—	—	—	—		Non-album single
"—" denotes a release that did not chart.

Notes

- + "Halo" peaked outside of the US Billboard Hot 100 chart, therefore they are listed on the Bubbling Under Hot 100 chart.
