= Breakfast at Tiffany's (song) =

1995 single by Deep Blue Something

Single by Deep Blue Something

from the album Home
- Released: July 10, 1995
- Genre: Pop rock
- Length: 4:16
- Label: Interscope; Rainmaker
- Songwriter: Todd Pipes
- Producer: David Castell

Deep Blue Something singles chronology
"Breakfast at Tiffany's" (1995)	"Halo" (1996)

Music video
- "Breakfast at Tiffany's" on YouTube

"Breakfast at Tiffany's" is a song by American alternative rock band Deep Blue Something. Originally appearing on their 1993 album 11th Song, it was later re-recorded and released on their 1994 album Home. Released as a single in July 1995 by Interscope and Rainmaker, the song was the band's only hit in the United States, peaking at number five on the US Billboard Hot 100 in January 1996. Outside the United States, "Breakfast at Tiffany's" topped the UK Singles Chart and peaked within the top ten on the charts of Australia, Flanders, Canada, Denmark, Germany, Iceland, Ireland, Israel, and Sweden.

Todd Pipes said in a Q magazine article about the promotion of "Breakfast at Tiffany's", "As the song had 'breakfast' in the title, radio stations thought it would be genius to have us on at breakfast time. We'd be up 'til 3 am and they'd wonder why we were pissed off playing at 6 am." Follow-up singles failed to match the success of "Breakfast at Tiffany's", hence the reason for the band's classification as a one-hit wonder.

== Inspiration and composition ==
"Breakfast at Tiffany's" is sung from the point of view of a man whose girlfriend is on the verge of breaking up with him because the two have nothing in common. Desperate to find something, the man brings up the Audrey Hepburn film Breakfast at Tiffany's, and his girlfriend recalls that they "both kinda liked it."

The film Roman Holiday inspired the lyrics of the song, but songwriter Todd Pipes thought that one of Hepburn's other films would make a better song title.

== Critical reception ==
Brian Wahlert called "Breakfast at Tiffany's" "a cute, catchy song that should fit in well on adult contemporary, Top-40 and alternative radio" with memorable melody that makes it "a perfect single, along with the mildly repetitive, conversational lyrics of the chorus and the bright, acoustic guitar". However, Tom Sinclair of Entertainment Weekly was unimpressed. He called it "possibly the year's most innocuous single, 'Breakfast at Tiffany's' is distressingly prosaic pop from a wimpy-sounding Texas quartet"; he added that it lacked any "musical piquancy". The Houston Press listed the song as the second worst by an artist from Texas, after Vanilla Ice's "Ice Ice Baby". Kevin Courtney from Irish Times said, "Deep Blue Something are responsible for the tawdry "Breakfast in Tiffany's" single, and their album is home to much of the same style of overblown, rainswept sentiment." British magazine Music Week gave the song top score with five out of five, naming it Single of the Week, writing, "Radio-friendly rock at its best from the Texan trio [sic]. A mighty, bright chorus, quirky lyrics and some great guitar work should enable it to come close in the UK to matching its Top Five placing Stateside." VH1 and Blender ranked the song number six on their list of the "50 Most Awesomely Bad Songs Ever".

== Music video ==
The accompanying music video for "Breakfast at Tiffany's" features the band members arriving to a breakfast table and being served by butlers, beside the curb in front of Tiffany & Co. in Midtown Manhattan. At the end of the video a young woman dressed in a similar style to Holly Golightly's (Audrey Hepburn) from the beginning of the film, except dressed in white rather than black, walks past on the sidewalk, and takes off her sunglasses. The band is also seen performing the song in a field, and on the bed of a flatbed truck in NYC.

== Track listings ==
- US cassette single

A1. "Breakfast at Tiffany's" (LP version) – 4:11
A2. "Breakfast at Tiffany's" (Crunch mix) – 4:11
B1. "A Water Prayer" (LP version) – 3:20
B2. "Breakfast at Tiffany's" (LP version) – 4:11

- Australian CD and cassette single, UK CD single
1. "Breakfast at Tiffany's" – 4:16
2. "A Water Prayer" – 3:19
3. "Sun" – 4:15
- UK cassette single and European CD single
1. "Breakfast at Tiffany's" – 4:16
2. "A Water Prayer" – 3:19

== Charts ==
=== Weekly charts ===
Chart (1995–1996)	Peak position
Australia (ARIA)	3
Austria (Ö3 Austria Top 40)	12
Belgium (Ultratop 50 Flanders)	7
Canada Top Singles (RPM)	4
Canada Adult Contemporary (RPM)	29
Denmark (IFPI)	3
Europe (Eurochart Hot 100)	5
Europe (European Hit Radio)	20
Germany (GfK)	6
Iceland (Íslenski Listinn Topp 40)	3
Ireland (IRMA)	3
Israel (Israeli Singles Chart)	9
Netherlands (Dutch Top 40)	17
Netherlands (Single Top 100)	11
New Zealand (Recorded Music NZ)	21
Scottish Singles Sales (Official Charts)	1
Sweden (Sverigetopplistan)	9
Switzerland (Schweizer Hitparade)	19
UK Singles (Official Charts)	1
US Billboard Hot 100	5
US Adult Alternative Airplay (Billboard)	18
US Adult Contemporary (Billboard)	8
US Adult Pop Airplay (Billboard)	3
US Alternative Airplay (Billboard)	30
US Pop Airplay (Billboard)	3
US Cash Box Top 100	3

=== Year-end charts ===
Chart (1995)	Position
Canada Top Singles (RPM)	86

Chart (1996)	Position
Australia (ARIA)	38
Belgium (Ultratop 50 Flanders)	63
Canada Top Singles (RPM)	46
Europe (Eurochart Hot 100)	46
Germany (Media Control)	24
Iceland (Íslenski Listinn Topp 40)	39
Israel (Israeli Singles Chart)	11
Sweden (Topplistan)	56
UK Singles (OCC)	17
UK Airplay (Music Week)	14
US Billboard Hot 100	39
US Adult Contemporary (Billboard)	26
US Adult Top 40 (Billboard)	19
US Top 40/Mainstream (Billboard)	33

== Certifications ==
Region	Certification	Certified units/sales
Australia (ARIA)	Gold	35,000^{^}
Canada (Music Canada)	Platinum	80,000^{‡}
Denmark (IFPI Danmark)	Gold	45,000^{‡}
Germany (BVMI)	Gold	250,000^{‡}
New Zealand (RMNZ)	2× Platinum	60,000^{‡}
United Kingdom (BPI)	2× Platinum	1,200,000^{‡}
^{^} Shipments figures based on certification alone.^{‡} Sales+streaming figures based on certification alone.

== Release history ==
Region	Date	Format(s)	Label(s)	Ref.
United States	July 10, 1995	Alternative radio	Interscope; Rainmaker	
United States	July 11, 1995	Contemporary hit radio	Interscope; Rainmaker	
Japan	June 21, 1996	CD	Interscope; MCA	
United Kingdom	June 24, 1996	CD; cassette	Interscope; Rainmaker	
United Kingdom	September 9, 1996 (re-release)	CD; cassette	Interscope; Rainmaker	

== Other uses ==
- In 2010, the song appeared in a Saturday Night Live skit, with four friends (played by Will Forte, Jason Sudeikis, Bill Hader and Ryan Phillippe) talking during the verses and singing the choruses.
- In May 2012, Episode 24 of New Girl highlighted the cast members dancing to this song. The group was listening to this song from Nick's mixtape where he was trying to convince himself to stay together with a likewise dissimilar girlfriend.
