= Nonprofit and Voluntary Sector Quarterly =

- Discipline: Interdisciplinary
- Language: English
- Edited by: Joanne Carman and Jaclyn Piatak

Publication details
- Former name: Journal of Voluntary Action Research
- History: 1972–present
- Publisher: SAGE Publications on behalf of the Association for Research on Nonprofit Organizations and Voluntary Action (United States)
- Frequency: Bimonthly
- Impact factor: 3.348 (2021)

Standard abbreviations
- ISO 4: Nonprofit Volunt. Sect. Q.

Indexing
- CODEN: NVSQEQ
- ISSN: 0899-7640 (print); 1552-7395 (web)
- LCCN: 89657278
- OCLC no.: 709956672

Links
- Journal homepage; Online access; Online archive

Nonprofit and Voluntary Sector Quarterly is a peer-reviewed academic journal that covers research on the nonprofit and voluntary sector. The journal's editors are Joanne Carman (University of North Carolina at Charlotte) and Jaclyn Piatak (University of North Carolina at Charlotte). It was established in 1972 and is currently published by SAGE Publications on behalf of the Association for Research on Nonprofit Organizations and Voluntary Action .

== Abstracting and indexing ==
Nonprofit and Voluntary Sector Quarterly is abstracted and indexed in Scopus and the Social Sciences Citation Index. According to the Journal Citation Reports, its 2021 impact factor is 3.348.
