= Desiree Sayle =

American Republican political aide

- Official portrait, 2026

Deputy Assistant to the President Executive Director of the Presidential Military Spouse Commission
- Incumbent
- Assumed office August 3, 2026
- President: Donald Trump
- Preceded by: Office established

Deputy Assistant to the President Director of the White House Office of Presidential Correspondence
- Incumbent
- Assumed office January 20, 2025
- President: Donald Trump
- Preceded by: Eva Kemp
- In office January 20, 2017 – January 20, 2021
- President: George W. Bush
- Preceded by: Fiona Reeves
- Succeeded by: Eva Kemp
- In office September 2001 – Late 2004
- Preceded by: Deborah K. Hair
- Succeeded by: Marguerite A. Murer

Director of the USA Freedom Corps
- In office Late 2004 – June 2008
- President: George W. Bush
- Preceded by: John M. Bridgeland
- Succeeded by: Henry Lozano

Personal details
- Born: Orange County, California
- Party: Republican

Desiree Thompson Sayle is an American political aide. She most recently served as deputy assistant to the president and director of Presidential Correspondence in the first Trump administration. She previously served in the same role from 2001 to 2004 during the Presidency of George W. Bush, and also served as Director of the USA Freedom Corps from 2004 to 2008.

== Early life ==
Sayle was born in Orange County, California, and raised in Quantico, Virginia; Jacksonville, North Carolina; and Northern Virginia. She studied architecture at Radford University.

Sayle is a lifelong volunteer from her beginning as a Girl Scout then as a Troop Leader for the Girl Scouts Nation's Capital. Sayle partnering with Special Olympics during high school and later helping low income women develop skills to enter the workforce. Sayle was manager of a local soccer team and currently volunteers in her community.

== Career ==
Sayle has held several roles in politics and government. She worked as Chief Clerk of the United States Senate Select Committee on Intelligence, as a Director of Operations for the Senate Republican Conference, Chairman John Thune, as an assistant to congressman Joe Barton of Texas, and worked as an aide in President George H. W. Bush's White House until 1992. During that time she worked on the 1990 G-7 Summit in Houston, Texas. After leaving the White House, she was campaign manager for the successful 1994 re-election campaign of Georgia congressman John Linder. For several years, she was correspondence director for America's Promise Alliance, the nonprofit organization founded and led by retired general Colin L. Powell, USA (Ret).

=== George W. Bush administration ===
At the start of the George W. Bush administration, she was appointed Director of Correspondence in the Office of the First Lady, Laura Bush. Following the September 11 attacks, however, Sayle was appointed Special Assistant to the President and Director of Presidential Correspondence. She continued in that role until late 2004, when she was appointed Deputy Assistant to the President and Director of the USA Freedom Corps. The USA Freedom Corps was a fifth policy council within the Executive Office of the President during the Bush administration, tasked with strengthening the culture of service, civic participation, and volunteerism among the American population.

She departed that role in 2008.

=== Donald Trump administration ===
During the presidential transition of Donald Trump, in the winter of 2016–17, she was hired as correspondence director for the transition organization. She was then appointed as Special Assistant to the President and Director of Presidential Correspondence in the Trump White House and elevated to a Deputy Assistant to the President in that role.

== Personal life ==
Sayle resides on Capitol Hill in Washington, D.C., with her three children.
