= VolunteerMatch =

Digital non-profit organization

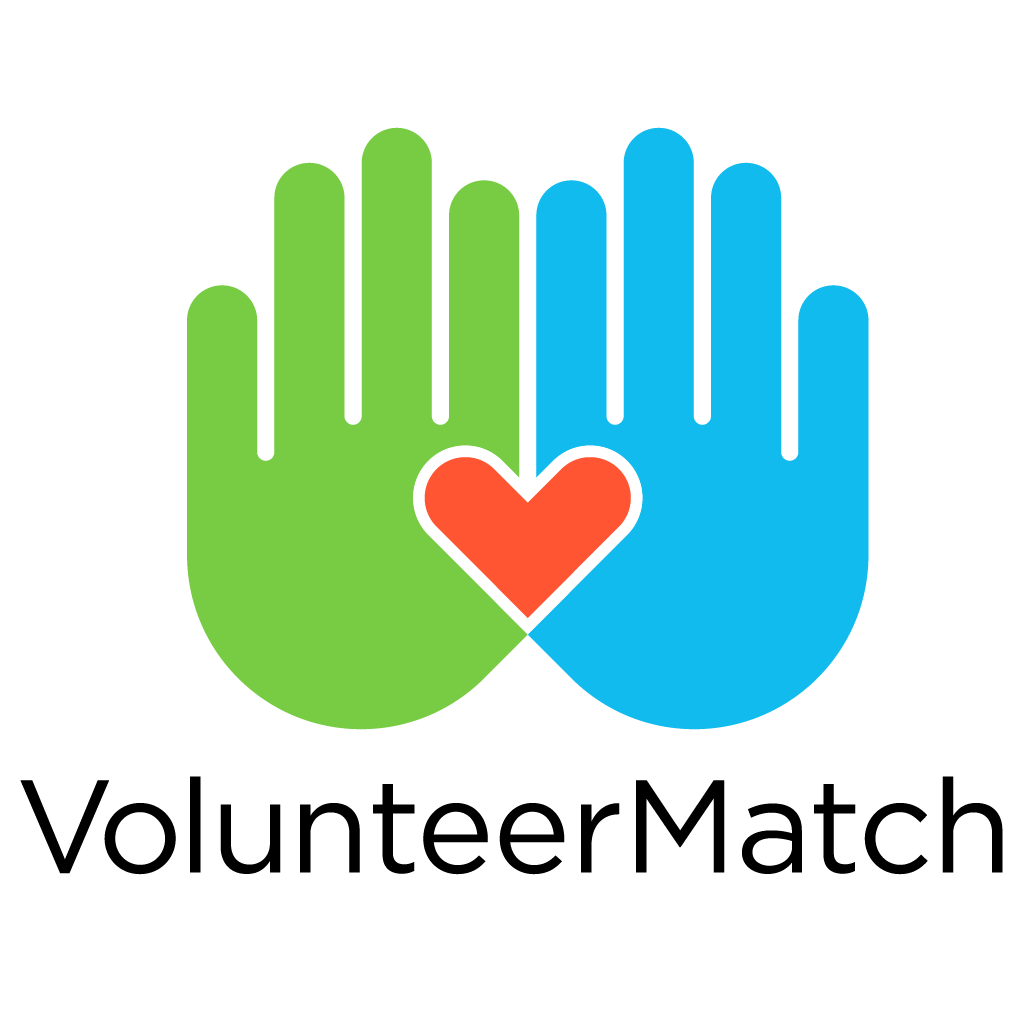
- Formation: April 25, 1998; 28 years ago
- Merger of: Impact Online and Volunteer America
- Tax ID no.: 77-0395654
- Legal status: 501(c)(3) nonprofit organization
- Headquarters: Oakland, California, United States
- Revenue: $4,372,376 (2018)
- Expenses: $4,025,921 (2018)
- Employees: 34 (2018)
- Volunteers: 10 (2018)
- Website: www.volunteermatch.org

Impact Online, also known as VolunteerMatch, is a U.S.-based nonprofit organization which provides a national digital infrastructure to serve volunteers and nonprofit organization in America. VolunteerMatch was founded in 1998.

The organization also partners with businesses to provide tools and services to help companies, brands, campuses and government manage volunteer programs and support corporate social responsibility initiatives. VolunteerMatch works with clients in different industries, and since its launch in 1998 it has won several awards.

== Services ==
VolunteerMatch is free to use by individuals. Nonprofit organizations may elect a free basic account or opt for more robust recruiting tools by becoming VolunteerMatch Members. Regional and national organizations with multiple chapters can elect for Group Membership which includes a bundle of enterprise tools for regional and national nonprofit organizations with multiple chapters. Products and services for companies, schools, and multi-chapter nonprofits are administered under its Business Solutions sub-brand.

On September 7, 2009, VolunteerMatch introduced a live map that displays search activity on its network in real-time. Also in 2010 it updated its Application Programming Interfaces (APIs) or Network Subscription for commercial use to increase accessibility to their volunteer network. In June 2011, VolunteerMatch Business Solutions introduced YourMatch to help businesses and organizations launch or grow volunteer engagement programs.

Over the last few years, VolunteerMatch began offering its network of 100,000 volunteer opportunities to BrightFunds, Causecast, CyberGrants, and YourCause customers. On July 31, 2018, the web's largest volunteer engagement network facilitated its 14 millionth nonprofit-volunteer connection.

The organization relies, in part, on donations to fund its services.

== History ==
Inspired by the potential of the web and the success of NetDay, VolunteerMatch.org was launched on April 25, 1998, as a merger between Impact Online, Inc. (a California nonprofit organization started by MBAs Mark Benning, Joanne Ernst, Steve Glikbarg, and Cindy Shove) and Volunteer America (a project co-founded by Jay Backstrand and Craig Jacoby).

Today the organization is called Impact Online, Inc., dba VolunteerMatch. Its early growth was fueled by attention from the mainstream media (particularly around the topic of virtual volunteering) and its success in competitions sponsored by industry and academic institutions. In 1998, it was a final selection for inclusion in the Smithsonian Institution Permanent Research Collection and was featured in an article in USA Today. In 1999, it was promoted by Oprah Winfrey on her show.

The organization's growth has also been spurred by an increased interest in disaster-related volunteering and service following natural and man-made disasters, including the September 11 attacks, Hurricane Katrina, and the 2010 Haiti earthquake. Following Hurricane Katrina, it began a partnership with the American Red Cross to integrate VolunteerMatch's Business Solutions with the Red Cross volunteer opportunity search system.

In 2005, the organization launched an initiative to promote older adult skilled volunteering. With initial funding from The Atlantic Philanthropies, it conducted research in 2006 that was published the following year as a report, Great Expectations: Boomers and the Future of Volunteering. On June 27, 2008, Boomer Volunteer Engagement: Collaborate Today, Thrive Tomorrow, a step-by-step guide for nonprofits to engage older adults and skilled volunteers, was co-published with the JFFixler Group.

VolunteerMatch reached one million volunteer connections on January 9, 2003; two million on March 16, 2005; three million on June 5, 2007; and four million on March 13, 2009. On July 31, 2019, VolunteerMatch celebrated its 14 millionth nonprofit-volunteer connection.

In 2009, it helped thousands of Americans participate in the first September 11 National Day of Service and Remembrance. As part of National Volunteer Week on April 16, 2010, UnitedHealthcare and VolunteerMatch released research on the health benefits of volunteering. On June 8, 2010, Ben & Jerry's released two ice cream flavors—Berry Voluntary and Brownie Chew Gooder—to promote Scoop It Forward, a partnership with Target and Ben & Jerry's aimed at encouraging consumers to volunteer at education-related nonprofits. December 31, 2010 marked the first time that mission-related revenue covered 100 percent of VolunteerMatch's annual costs. In September 2011, it listed 71,652 active volunteer opportunities from over 79,920 nonprofit organizations.

The organization announced it had generated seven million volunteer connections on July 11, 2013, in a press release announcement about its recommendations engine, the first ever for volunteer engagement. On June 16, 2014, VolunteerMatch partnered with LinkedIn to make it dramatically easier for nonprofits to tap into skilled and pro bono volunteer talent from LinkedIn's 300 million members.

In 2015, VolunteerMatch brought together 35 experts in volunteer engagement to curate an insightful collection of actionable advice on strengthening volunteer programs called "Volunteer Engagement 2.0: Ideas and Insights Changing the World." On September 14, 2017, UnitedHealthcare and VolunteerMatch released a follow-up to their original study, which revealed that 75 percent of U.S. adults feel physically healthier by volunteering.

January 24, 2017, four days after President Donald Trump's inauguration, marked the busiest day in the websites 20-year history. From January 20 to February 2, 2017, VolunteerMatch.org welcome over half a million unique visitors. Its second highest day of website traffic occurred on November 10, 2016, two days after the 2016 U.S. presidential election.

On April 25, 2018, VolunteerMatch celebrated its 20th birthday.

On January 14, 2025, it was announced that VolunteerMatch and Idealist are merging.

== Awards and presidential support ==
In 1999 VolunteerMatch was awarded the Socially Responsible Award from the MIT Sloan School of Management eCommerce. It received a Macworld Web Award in 2000, and in 2001 it received two Webby Awards in the categories of Services and Activism. In 2008 it was voted "Best .Org Web Site" at the annual People's Choice Awards during the Nonprofit Technology Conference in New Orleans.

VolunteerMatch.org has been cited by three U.S. Presidents as a useful resource for civic engagement. During an August 31, 2002 radio address eight months after the 9/11 attacks, George W. Bush said, "The response to the call to service has been strong. VolunteerMatch, a group that matches volunteers to charities on the USA Freedom Corps web page, reports that referrals have increased by more than 70 percent over last year." In GIVING: How Each of Us Can Change the World, President Bill Clinton cited VolunteerMatch as a resource for "Giving Time." And in a January 1, 2008 platform statement on service and volunteering, President Barack Obama wrote, "Technology can help. Existing sites like USAFreedomCorps.gov and VolunteerMatch.org represent a good start."

== Similar organizations ==
VolunteerMatch provides some services similar to those of UK-based Worldwide Helpers, though the latter organization focuses only on projects that are low-cost to the volunteer.
