= NVFC =

NVFC may refer to:

- National Volunteer Fire Council, a U.S. association for the volunteer fire and emergency services
- Northern Virginia Royals, an American soccer team
- Northwich Victoria F.C., an English football club
- Northwich Villa F.C., an English football club, now known as Northwich Manchester Villa F.C.
- Nordvest FC, a Danish football club
- Nantlle Vale F.C., a Welsh football club
