= CaliforniaVolunteers =

State agency

CaliforniaVolunteers is the state agency charged with increasing the number and impact of Californians engaged in service and volunteering.

CaliforniaVolunteers administers the state AmeriCorps portfolio in California, Citizen Corps and the Cesar Chavez Day of Service and Learning, and is designated as the state agency in charge of managing volunteers in times of disaster.

In addition, CaliforniaVolunteers developed and maintains the largest online statewide volunteer matching network in the nation on CaliforniaVolunteers.org, and guides policy development to support the nonprofit and service fields.

CaliforniaVolunteers is overseen by a bipartisan 25-member commission appointed by the governor. The first lady of California serves as the honorary chair of the commission.

== Programs ==
=== AmeriCorps in California ===
AmeriCorps is sometimes referred to as the “domestic Peace Corps.” Participants – known as AmeriCorps members – perform a year of service with a program that meets local community needs. AmeriCorps programs focus on the five issue areas of education, the environment, public safety, disaster preparedness and other human needs.

In its role as the state service commission, CaliforniaVolunteers supported more than 5,500 AmeriCorps members in the 2006/07 program year via $32 million in grants to 60 programs statewide.

- CaliforniaVolunteers’ AmeriCorps grants provide funding for member living allowances, health benefits, childcare (for eligible members), AmeriCorps program staff, training, evaluation and other program operating costs.
- Recent grants have ranged from $158,132 to $1.5 million, with an average grant size of $516,637.
- The majority of that investment (52 percent) is in education-related programming.
- Members also receive an education award directly from the federal Corporation For National and Community Service

=== Citizen Corps ===
California's Citizen Corps Program's mission is to coordinate in-state volunteer activities to make communities better prepared to respond to any emergency situation. The program was established after the creation of the USA Freedom Corps by President George W. Bush. Existing disaster and public safety related volunteer programming was consolidated under the new Citizen Corps name. The program's mission is accomplished through a national network of state, local and tribal Citizen Corps Councils.

Community Emergency Response Team (CERT):

- The CERT Program educates people about disaster preparedness for hazards that may impact their area and trains them in basic disaster response skills, such as fire safety, light search and rescue, team organization, and disaster medical operations. Using the training learned in the classroom and during exercises, CERT members can assist others in their neighborhood or workplace following an event when professional responders are not immediately available to help.
- The Community Emergency Response Team concept was originally developed and implemented by the Los Angeles City Fire Department (LAFD) in 1985.

Medical Reserve Corps:

- The Medical Reserve Corps (MRC) utilizes volunteers who want to donate their time and expertise to prepare for and respond to emergencies and promote healthy living throughout the year.
- MRC volunteers include medical and public health professionals such as physicians, nurses, pharmacists, dentists, veterinarians, and epidemiologists. Many community members—interpreters, chaplains, office workers, legal advisors, and others—can fill key support positions.

Volunteers in Police Service:

- The VIPS Program provides support and resources for agencies interested in developing or enhancing a volunteer program and for citizens who wish to volunteer their time and skills with a community law enforcement agency. The program's ultimate goal is to enhance the capacity of state and local law enforcement to utilize volunteers.

Fire Corps:

- Fire Corps works to increase the capacity of fire and emergency medical services departments through the use of citizen advocates in non-emergency roles so they can develop, implement, and sustain programs and services that will help their department meet the needs of their community.

USAonWatch:

- USAOnWatch was created to encourage the initiation and/or revitalization of Neighborhood Watch programs throughout the country.
- Since September 11, 2001, Neighborhood Watch programs have also engaged residents in disaster preparedness, convened evacuation drills and exercises and organized Community Emergency Response Team (CERT) trainings.

=== Cesar Chavez Day of Service and Learning ===
The Cesar Chavez Day holiday was established in 2000 in California by the passage of SB 984. CaliforniaVolunteers administers the Cesar Chavez Day of Service and Learning program which works to engage California's youth in service and civic participation while learning about Chavez’ life and legacy.

In 2006/07 the Cesar Chavez Day program:

- Launched 77 Cesar E. Chavez afterschool service clubs in Title 1 middle schools in 38 cities in California serving 58,000 kids.
- Built 10 new playgrounds with 2,500 volunteers in communities across the state which will serve 100,000 kids.

=== California Volunteer Matching Network ===
CaliforniaVolunteers.org launched in September 2006, featuring the largest statewide online volunteer matching system in the nation.

- On CaliforniaVolunteers.org individuals and families can enter their zip code or county, identify their areas of interest and find volunteering opportunities in their own communities.
- As of September 2007, there were nearly 30,000 volunteer opportunities available throughout the state involving the arts, education, animals, disaster preparedness and other areas of interest.

== History ==
On September 21, 1993 President Bill Clinton signed the National and Community Service Trust Act of 1993 (PL 103-82). This law merged two federal agencies, ACTION and the Commission on National and Community Service, creating the new Corporation for National and Community Service. The Act also established AmeriCorps, a service program for Americans ages seventeen years and older.

The Act required the governor of each state to create and appoint a commission to administer the AmeriCorps program. In 1994, Governor Pete Wilson created the state service commission originally known as the Commission on Improving Life Through Service through Executive Order W-77-94.

The organization was renamed by Governor Gray Davis as the Governor's Office On Service and Volunteerism (GO SERV) in 2001.

In August 2004, the organization was renamed the California Service Corps.

In April 2006, Governor Schwarzenegger signed Executive Order S-04-06, declaring the commission, in cooperation with the Health and Human Services Agency, the Office of Emergency Services, the Office of Homeland Security, and non-profit volunteer organizations, shall ensure the coordination of volunteer activities related to disaster response and recovery, including necessary training, equipment, and transportation provisions.

In December 2006, Governor Schwarzenegger signed Executive Order S-24-06, renaming the organization CaliforniaVolunteers.

== See also ==
- AmeriCorps
- Citizen Corps
