= California Volunteers =

California Volunteers may refer to:

- Volunteer units from California in the American Civil War
- CaliforniaVolunteers, a state agency for volunteer service
- California Volunteers (sculpture), a sculpture by Douglas Tilden
