= HuffPost =

US progressive news website

- Website type: News aggregator, blog
- Available in: English; French; Greek; Italian; Japanese; Korean; Portuguese; Spanish
- Founded: May 9, 2005; 21 years ago
- Headquarters: 770 Broadway; New York City, U.S.
- Area served: Anglosphere, Francosphere, Hispanosphere, Lusosphere
- Owner: BuzzFeed
- Creators: Arianna Huffington; Kenneth Lerer; Jonah Peretti; Andrew Breitbart
- Website: www.huffpost.com
- Commercial: No
- Registration: Optional
- Launched: May 9, 2005; 21 years ago
- Current status: Active

HuffPost (The Huffington Post until 2017, itself often abbreviated as HuffPo), a division of Buzzfeed, is an American progressive news website, with localized and international editions. The site offers news, satire, blogs, and original content, and covers politics, business, entertainment, environment, technology, popular media, lifestyle, culture, comedy, healthy eating, young women's interests, and local news.

In 2012, the website became the first commercially run United States digital media enterprise to win a Pulitzer Prize.

Founded by Arianna Huffington, Andrew Breitbart, Kenneth Lerer, and Jonah Peretti, the site was launched on May 9, 2005. In March 2011, it was acquired by AOL for US$315 million and Arianna Huffington was appointed editor-in-chief. In June 2015, Verizon Communications acquired AOL for US$4.4 billion, and the site became a part of Verizon Media. In November 2020, BuzzFeed acquired the company.

== History ==
The Huffington Post was launched on May 9, 2005. It was founded by Arianna Huffington, Andrew Breitbart, Kenneth Lerer, and Jonah Peretti.

In August 2006, the website raised a $5 million Series A round from SoftBank Capital and Greycroft. In December 2008, the website raised $25 million, to be used for technology, infrastructure, investigative journalism, and development of local versions, from Oak Investment Partners at a $100 million valuation and Fred Harman of Oak Investment Partners joined its board of directors.

In June 2009, Eric Hippeau, co-managing partner of Softbank Capital, became CEO.

In 2011, the site began the strategy of crafting search-engine optimized (SEO) stories and headlines based around trending keywords, such as "What Time Is the Super Bowl?" In January 2011, the website received 35% of its traffic from web search engines (SEOs), compared to 20% at CNN. This strategy appealed to AOL CEO Tim Armstrong, who tried to implement similar SEO-driven journalism practices at AOL. In March 2011, AOL acquired The Huffington Post for US$315 million. As part of the deal, Huffington became president and editor-in-chief of The Huffington Post as well as of AOL properties Engadget, TechCrunch, Moviefone, MapQuest, Black Voices, PopEater (now subpage on the HuffPost Entertainment subpage), AOL Music, AOL Latino (now HuffPost Voices), AutoBlog, Patch, and StyleList. Folded into Huffington Post were AOL Black Voices, which was established in 1995 as Blackvoices.com, and AOL Latino, Impact (launched in 2010 as a partnership between Huffington Post and Causecast), Women, Teen, College, Religion, and the Spanish-language Voces (en español). The Voices brand was expanded in September 2011 with the launch of Gay Voices, dedicated to LGBT-relevant articles. Former CEO Eric Hippeau left the company.

The website surpassed NYTimes.com in traffic in June 2011. In December 2011, the website had 36.2 million unique visitors.

In May 2012, a U.S.-based Spanish-language edition was launched under the name HuffPost Voces, replacing AOL Latino.

In August 2012, it launched HuffPost Live, an online video channel.

By late 2013, the website operated as a "stand-alone business" within AOL, taking control of more of its own business and advertising operations, and directing more effort towards securing "premium advertising".

In June 2015, Verizon acquired AOL for US$4.4 billion and the site became a part of Verizon Media. Huffington resigned to pursue other ventures and was succeeded as editor-in-chief by Lydia Polgreen in December 2016.

In April 2017, the website changed its name to HuffPost and changes were made to the design of its website and logo, and content and reporting.

In January 2019, 20 employees were laid off as a part of Verizon Media laying off 7% of its staff. The opinion and health sections were eliminated. Pulitzer Prize finalist Jason Cherkis lost his job.

In July 2019, the website published a story written by Rachel Wolfson, a publicist, that praised financier Jeffrey Epstein. Editors later removed the article at the author's request.

In March 2020, Polgreen resigned as editor-in-chief to become the head of content at Gimlet Media.

In February 2021, BuzzFeed acquired HuffPost from Verizon Media for stock.

In March 2021, BuzzFeed CEO Jonah Peretti said that the company had lost "around $20 million" during the previous year. BuzzFeed laid off 47 HuffPost staff, mostly journalists, in the U.S. and closed down HuffPost Canada, laying off 23 staff.

In April 2021, Danielle Belton became editor-in-chief.

Following the shut-down of BuzzFeed News in 2023, BuzzFeed, Inc. refocused its news efforts into HuffPost, with plans to rehire past BuzzFeed News employees at HuffPost or at BuzzFeed. The move also stemmed from lower advertiser interest in traditional news platforms.

In January 2025, it launched a freemium version in which users can pay to have an ad-free version of the site and get additional features. At that time, the website had 60 million monthly global visitors.

By July 2025, traffic dropped 40% due to Google's "AI Overviews" feature, with AI-generated blurbs diverting traffic from publisher content.

=== U.S. local editions ===
| Launch Date | Location | Notes | Ref(s). |
|---|---|---|---|
| June 2008 | Chicago | First local edition | |
| June 2009 | New York City | | |
| September 2009 | Denver | | |
| December 2009 | Los Angeles | | |
| July 2011 | San Francisco | Launch had SEO benefits | |
| November 2011 | Detroit | | |
| November 2011 | Miami | | |
| September 2013 | Hawaii | Launched in collaboration with Honolulu Civil Beat, co-founded by Pierre Omidyar | |

=== International editions ===
| Launch Date | Location | Notes | Ref(s). |
|---|---|---|---|
| May 2011 | Canada | First international edition; shut down in March 2021 after acquisition of HuffPost by BuzzFeed | |
| July 2011 | United Kingdom | In April 2026, it added generative AI capabilities from Taboola. | |
| January 2012 | France (Le Huffington Post) | French-language edition and the first in a non-English speaking country. Launched in partnership with Le Monde and Les Nouvelles Editions Indépendantes. Anne Sinclair was named editorial director; she stood by her husband, Dominique Strauss-Kahn, former managing director of the International Monetary Fund, when several women accused him of sexual assault. Commentators at l'Express, Rue89, and Le Monde warned of a potential conflict of interest in the French edition's news coverage. | |
| February 2012 | Quebec | French-language edition | |
| June 2012 | Spain (El Huffington Post, later ElHuffPost) | | |
| May 2013 | Japan (ハフポスト, HuffPost Japan) | First edition in an Asian country. Launched with the collaboration of Asahi Shimbun. | |
| November 2011 | Italy (L'Huffington Post) | Directed by Lucia Annunziata in collaboration with Gruppo Editoriale L'Espresso. | |
| June 2013 | Maghreb French (Al Huffington Post) | Shut down in December 2019 | |
| October 2013 | Germany and German-speaking Europe | Launched in co-operation with Focus. Shut down in March 2018. | |
| January 2014 | The World (WorldPost) | Created in partnership with the Berggruen Institute | |
| January 2014 | Brazil | First edition in Latin America. Launched in partnership with Grupo Abril. Shut down in November 2020. | |
| February 2014 | South Korea | Launched in partnership with The Hankyoreh. | |
| November 2014 | Greece | | |
| June 2008 | India | Launched in partnership with The Times of India. Shut down in November 2020. | |
| July 2015 | HuffPost Arabi | Arabic-language edition. Launched in partnership with Wadah Khanfar. Shut down in April 2018. | |
| August 2015 | Australia | | |
| November 2016 | South Africa | First sub-Saharan edition. Launched in partnership with Media24. In April 2017, it was directed by the press ombudsman to apologize unreservedly for publishing and later defending a column calling for disenfranchisement of white men, which was declared malicious, inaccurate and discriminatory hate speech. Shut down with end of partnership in July 2018. | |

=== Contributor network ===
From its launch in 2005 until it was shut down in January 2018, HuffPost featured a contributor network with articles from as many as 100,000 unpaid bloggers. Bloggers included notable people such as Barack Obama, Robert Reich, and Catherine, Duchess of Cambridge. The contributor network was criticized for providing a platform to promote vaccine hesitancy. It was also criticized since the bloggers were unpaid; this resulted in calls to boycott the site endorsed by the National Writers Union and NewsGuild-CWA and a lawsuit filed by Jonathan Tasini that was dismissed with prejudice by the court.

== Political stance ==
HuffPost has been described as a progressive, liberal or liberal-leaning outlet,

Upon becoming the editor-in-chief in December 2016, Lydia Polgreen said that the "wave of intolerance and bigotry that seems to be sweeping the globe" after the election as US president of Donald Trump was remarkable, and that The Huffington Post had an "absolutely indispensable role to play in this era in human history."

HuffPost has been considered as a left-wing version of the Drudge Report.

In 2012, Arianna Huffington stated that the website was "increasingly seen" as an Internet newspaper that is "not positioned ideologically in terms of how we cover the news". According to Michael Steel, press secretary for Republican Speaker of the House John Boehner, Republican aides "engage with liberal websites like The Huffington Post [anyway, if for] no other reason than [because] they drive a lot of cable coverage". Jon Bekken, journalism professor at Suffolk University, has cited it as an example of an "advocacy newspaper".

=== Nicknames given by conservative media ===
In 2011, James Taranto, editor of The Wall Street Journal, mockingly referred to the website as the "Puffington Host", while Rush Limbaugh referred to it as the "Huffing and Puffington Post".

=== Criticism of Donald Trump before the 2016 U.S. presidential election ===
Before the 2016 United States presidential election, HuffPost regularly appended an editor's note to the end of stories about candidate Donald Trump, reading: "Donald Trump regularly incites political violence and is a serial liar, rampant xenophobe, racist, misogynist and birther who has repeatedly pledged to ban all Muslims—1.6 billion members of an entire religion—from entering the U.S." After Trump was elected on November 8, 2016, HuffPost ended this practice to "give respect to the office of the presidency."

== Awards ==
- Won a Pulitzer Prize in 2012 in the category of national reporting for senior military correspondent David Wood's Beyond the Battlefield, a 10-part series about wounded veterans. HuffPost was the first commercially run United States digital media enterprise to win a Pulitzer Prize.
- 2010 "People's Voice" winner in the 14th Webby Awards. The Huffington Post lost the 2010 Webby Award jury prize for "Best Political Blog" to Truthdig.
- Peabody Award in 2010 for "Trafficked: A Youth Radio Investigation".
- Named second among the "25 Best Blogs of 2009" by Time.
- Won the 2006 and 2007 Webby Awards for "Best Politics Blog".
- Contributor Bennet Kelley was awarded the Los Angeles Press Club's 2007 Southern California Journalism Award for Online Commentary for political commentary published on the site.
- Ranked the most powerful blog in the world by The Observer in 2008.
- Nominated in 2015 for the "Responsible Media of the Year" award at the British Muslim Awards.
