= Presidential Military Spouse Commission =

United States government body

President Donald Trump signing an executive order creating the commission on August 3, 2026

The Presidential Military Spouse Commission is a federal commission created by Executive Order 14415, signed by U.S. president Donald Trump in August 2026.

The commission is tasked with advising the President on issues including housing, healthcare, employment, education, and deployment support for military spouses. The commission is chaired by Jennifer Hegseth, wife of United States Secretary of Defense Pete Hegseth. The panel will submit annual reports to the president and a final report after two years.

The U.S. Department of Defense will provide administrative support and funding for the commission, which operates under the Federal Advisory Committee Act.

== Members ==
Members and leaders of the commission as of September 2026 are as follows:

=== Leadership ===
- Chairwoman: Jennifer Hegseth — spouse of Secretary of Defense
- Deputy Assistant to the President and Executive Director: Desiree Sayle

=== Commission members ===
- Christie Mullin — spouse of the Secretary of Homeland Security
- Vacant — spouse of the Secretary of the Army
- April Cao — spouse of the Secretary of the Navy
- Jean Meink — spouse of the Secretary of the Air Force
- Mary Mahoney — spouse of the Vice Chairman of the Joint Chiefs of Staff
- Katrina Isom — spouse of the Senior Enlisted Advisor to the Chairman of the Joint Chiefs of Staff
- Kim LaNeve — spouse of the Chief of Staff of the Army
- Trish Smith — spouse of the Commandant of the Marine Corps
- Donna Caudle — spouse of the Chief of Naval Operations
- Cindy Wilsbach — spouse of the Chief of Staff of the Air Force
- Deborah Schiess — spouse of the Chief of Space Operations
- Shannon Nordhaus — spouse of the Chief of the National Guard Bureau
- Karen Raines — spouse of the Senior Enlisted Advisor to the Chief of the National Guard Bureau
- Lynda-Lee Lunday — spouse of the Commandant of the Coast Guard
- Kimberly Weimer — spouse of the Sergeant Major of the Army
- Andrea Ruiz — spouse of the Sergeant Major of the Marine Corps
- Angie Perryman — spouse of the Master Chief Petty Officer of the Navy
- Doniel Wolfe, Ed.D. — spouse of the Chief Master Sergeant of the Air Force
- Cathy Bentivegna — spouse of the Chief Master Sergeant of the Space Force
- Krystal Waldron — spouse of the Master Chief Petty Officer of the Coast Guard
