= National Emergency Technology Guard =

Proposed United States volunteer group

The National Emergency Technology Guard (NET Guard) is a conceptual corps of volunteers with technology experience that help out after disasters in the United States. It is codified under Public Law 107–296 on November 25, 2002 as part of the creation of the Department of Homeland Security created by the Homeland Security Act of 2002. In 2018, Public Law No: 115-278 was codified to amend the authority of creating NET Guard to the Cybersecurity and Infrastructure Security Agency.

The planned role of NET Guard teams would be to repair downed communications systems, restore computer operations and create new systems to aid support and recovery efforts. Volunteers would receive training periodically, like members of the National Guard, and would have a clear chain of command to coordinate efforts. In addition, Net Guard would be responsible for maintaining a strategic reserve of equipment—like cellphones, switches, computers and satellite dishes—that could be deployed on short notice. The corps could also maintain a database of volunteers with professional expertise, such as those with knowledge of smallpox or technology professionals with knowledge of computer viruses.

== History ==
The original idea for NET Guard was proposed by Andrew Rasiej, a New York city based tech and social entrepreneur who organized volunteers with tech experience to provide emergency tech support to schools and small businesses in the wake of the September 11 attacks. He brought the idea of creating a national "tech corps" to Senator Ron Wyden who chairs the Senate Commerce, Science, and Transportation Subcommittee (on Science, Technology, and Space) and Senator George Allen who proposed the initiative in early 2002 as a way to respond to the aftermath of the 9/11 attacks. They introduced the idea in the Science and Technology Emergency Mobilization Act, which was later incorporated into the bill that created the Department of Homeland Security. However, NET Guard was not yet created.

On June 18, 2008, the Federal Emergency Management Agency (FEMA) announced it was starting a pilot of the program as a potential new Citizen Corps program. FEMA designated US$320,000 available for the program in fiscal year 2008. After the pilot program, no new updates or funding were made to the program.

In 2018, the authority to create the NET Guard was placed with the Director of the Cybersecurity and Infrastructure Security Agency (CISA).

== NET Guard Team Concept ==
NET Guard teams would be composed of volunteers with information technology (IT) and communications expertise. Teams are a local asset, managed at the local level, and deployed in response to a request from local or State authorities.

== 2008 Pilot Teams ==
FEMA announced September 17 that it was granting four districts $80,000 each to start a pilot program: the city of Austin, Texas; the city of Chesapeake, Virginia; Cottonwood Heights, Utah; and Hamilton County, Indiana.
