= USA Freedom Corps =

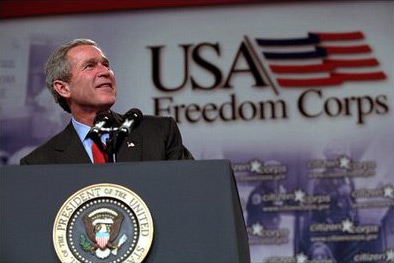
George W. Bush speaks in front of a USA Freedom Corps display.

USA Freedom Corps was a White House office and fifth policy council (along with Domestic, Economic, National Security, and Homeland Security) within the Executive Office of the President of the United States under George W. Bush, who as President served as its chair. Bush announced its creation during his 2002 State of the Union Address, and the Corps was officially established the next day (30 January), describing itself as a "Coordinating Council... working to strengthen our culture of service and help find opportunities for every American to start volunteering."

A USA Freedom Corps Network and online clearinghouse promoted individual volunteer service opportunities within the United States and abroad and connected Americans to opportunities to serve in federal programs, such as AmeriCorps, Peace Corps, and Senior Corps, or to find local service opportunities by zip code and interest. The council and office were also involved with U.S. federal government service programs and provided new support for these existing programs. AmeriCorps grew from 50,000 to 75,000 in 2004. The Peace Corps reached its highest levels in more than 30 years. Freedom Corps also created new programs such as the Citizen Corps for homeland security, Volunteers for Prosperity for international volunteering, and a President's Council on Service and Civic Participation, which promoted the new President's Volunteer Service Award.

Henry C. Lozano was Deputy Assistant to the President and Director of USA Freedom Corps from September 11, 2007 until July 25, 2008. He was preceded by Desiree Thompson Sayle and succeeded by Alison T. Young. The first director of the program was John Bridgeland, previously director of the Domestic Policy Council on George W. Bush's White House staff.

The USA Freedom Corps also announced it has begun to work "with educators and others to help increase civic awareness and participation" across the United States and hosted a White House Summit on American History, Civics and Service, resulting in new initiatives to support civic education at the National Endowment for the Humanities and the National Archives. In his 2003 State of the Union Address, President Bush also announced that his USA Freedom Corps would provide new support school-based and community-based mentoring, including mentoring children of prisoners, working in partnership with his faith-based initiative. The goal to reach 100,000 children of prisoners with mentors was met.

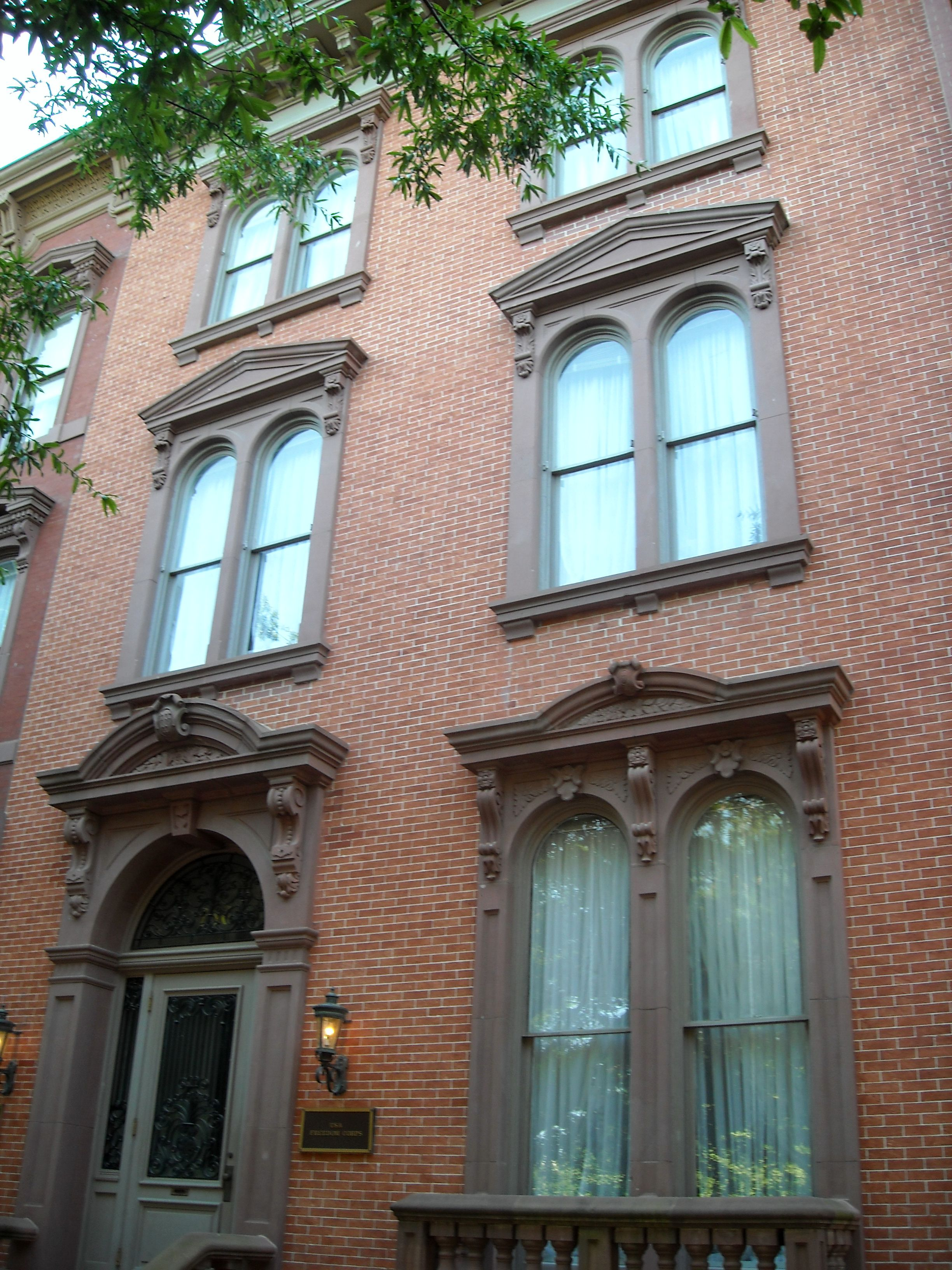
USA Freedom Corps headquarters was on Jackson Place, across from the White House

Created within months of the 2001 September 11 attacks, the body sought in part to encourage volunteer participation in homeland security.

USA Freedom Corps put in place the first annual measurement of volunteer service at the Census Bureau. Volunteering rose from 59.8 million Americans from September 2001 to 65.4 million Americans by September 2005, sustaining the wave of volunteering that occurred after the terrorist attacks of 9/11.

The Corps came to international attention on January 3, 2005, when George W. Bush named former presidents George H. W. Bush and Bill Clinton to lead a major campaign, through the Corps, to raise funds from private individuals and businesses to provide humanitarian support for victims of the 2004 Indian Ocean earthquake and tsunami. President Obama followed the USA Freedom Corps model by tapping Presidents George W. Bush and Bill Clinton to lead the fundraising efforts in the aftermath of the 2010 Haiti earthquake.

Key components of the USA Freedom Corps have been continued under the administration of President Obama, including the Volunteers for Prosperity program that was authorized under the Edward M. Kennedy Serve America Act; the Citizen Corps for homeland security and its component programs—Volunteers in Police Service, Medical Reserve Corps, Community Emergency Response Teams, Fire Corps, and Citizen Corps Councils—the President's Volunteer Service Award; and the White House USA Freedom Corps office, now called the White House Office of Social Innovation and Civic Participation. The White House Office of Faith-Based and Community Initiatives, which was under the USA Freedom Corps, was also continued by President Obama as the Office of Faith-Based and Neighborhood Partnerships.

== See also ==
- Corporation for National and Community Service
- Association for Volunteer Administration
- Association for Leaders in Volunteer Engagement
- Action Without Borders
- Freikorps
- Hands on Network
- VolunteerMatch
