= Lydia Polgreen =

American journalist

- Born: Lydia Frances Polgreen; 1975 (age 50–51); United States
- Education: St. John's College; Columbia University
- Occupation: Journalist
- Notable credit(s): The Huffington Post; The New York Times
- Spouse: Candace Feit

Lydia Frances Polgreen (born 1975) is an American journalist. She was editorial director of NYT Global at The New York Times, and the West Africa bureau chief for the same publication, based in Dakar, Senegal, from 2005 to 2009. She also reported from India. She spent much of her early career in Johannesburg, South Africa where she was The New York Times South African Bureau Chief as well. She was editor-in-chief of HuffPost from 2016 to 2020, after which she spent about one year between 2021 and 2022 as the head of content for Gimlet Media. In 2022, after leaving Gimlet, she returned to The New York Times as an opinion columnist.

She has received many honors and awards, among them, the 2009 Livingston Award for Excellence in International Reporting and, in 2011, the Medal for Excellence from Columbia University.

== Education ==
Polgreen graduated from St. John's College in 1997 and Columbia University Graduate School of Journalism in 2000.

== Career ==
She started working at The New York Times in 2002.

In 2006, she received a George Polk Award in Foreign Reporting from Long Island University for her coverage of ethnic violence in the Darfur region of Sudan.

In February 2008, she covered the Battle of N'Djamena in Chad. Some of her work in N’Djamena was illustrated by the French freelance photographer Benedicte Kurzen.

In April 2016, she became the editorial director of NYT Global for The New York Times. On December 6, 2016, she left The New York Times to succeed the founder of The Huffington Post, Arianna Huffington, as editor-in-chief.

In 2021, she was named to Fast Company's Queer 50 list.

== Personal life ==
Polgreen's mother is originally from Ethiopia, and her father was a white American.

Polgreen is married to Candace Feit, a documentary photographer. In November 2017, Polgreen was nominated to Out magazine's "OUT100" for 2017 in recognition of her work and visibility. She identifies as both Black and White; as American and African (she was born in America); as a woman; and as a lesbian.
