= Henry Lozano =

American non-profit executive and grassroots organizer

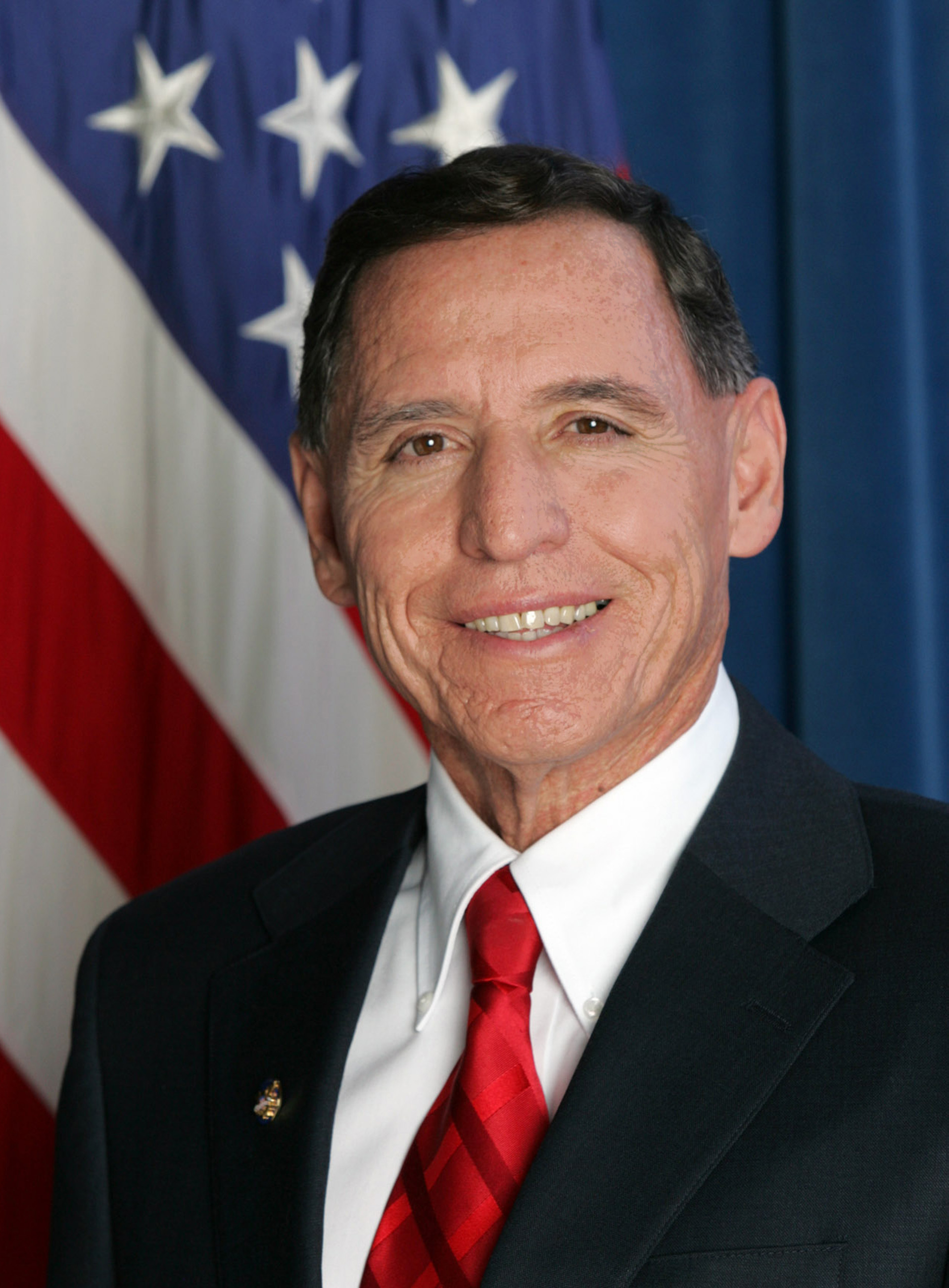
- Lozano in 2007

Director - Los Angeles County Teen Challenge and Urban Ministries Initiative
- In office August 10, 2011 – current

Executive Director Shinnyo-en Foundation
- In office August 3, 2009 – April 30, 2011

Deputy Assistant to the President Director of USA Freedom Corps
- In office September 11, 2007 – July 25, 2008
- Preceded by: Desiree Thompson Sayle
- Succeeded by: Alison T. Young

Personal details
- Born: August 24, 1948 (age 78) Artesia, California
- Spouse(s): Paulette Nagle (m. Easter Sunday 2004)
- Relations: Henry Lozano, Sr. (father); Liduvina Quintana Lozano (mother)
- Children: Garry Marlin (b. May 10, 1968); Paul Lozano (b. July 5, 1970) (Christy - wife) (grandchildren: Garrett & Maya)
- Education: Calexico High School (1966); Cal Poly San Luis Obispo
- Profession: Non-profit Executive; Grassroots Organizer

Henry Lozano (born August 24, 1948) is a non-profit executive and grassroots organizer. His years of public service culminated in his post at the White House as Deputy Assistant to the President and Director of USA Freedom Corps. On August 10, 2011, he was appointed to serve as the Director of Los Angeles County Teen Challenge and Urban Ministries Initiatives.

On September 11, 2007, President George W. Bush asked Lozano to step into the job of Deputy Assistant to the President and director of USA Freedom Corps. In this role, he advanced the "Call to Service" initiative launched by President George W. Bush in his 2002 "State of the Union" address. President George W. Bush created USA Freedom Corps to build on the countless acts of service, sacrifice and generosity that followed the Sept. 11, 2001 attacks.

As director, Lozano coordinated service and volunteering efforts with organizations ranging from the Peace Corps and AmeriCorps to the Senior Corps and the Points of Light Foundation. He oversaw creation of the volunteer.gov website (which recently evolved into www.serve.gov, the "central hub" for service and volunteer coordination under President Obama). Lozano is a graduate of Teen Challenge, a spiritually-based recovery program. Throughout his career, he has championed many causes, especially those related to substance abuse prevention and recovery programs.

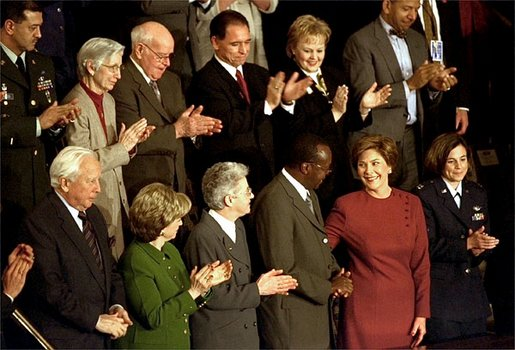
Henry Lozano stands applauding behind First Lady Laura Bush at the 2003 State of the Union address.

In 2003, George W. Bush invited Lozano to the First Lady's box during his State of the Union address. In his speech, the president said: "Let us bring to all Americans who struggle with drug addiction this message of hope: The miracle of recovery is possible, and it could be you."

In 2005, Lozano was awarded the Presidential Call to Service Award in recognition of a lifetime of service.

== Early life and career ==
Henry Lozano was born in Artesia, California, on August 24, 1948. His father was Henry C. "Hank" Lozano, Sr. (born in Tyrone, New Mexico, his family came from Chihuahua, Mexico). His mother is Liduvina Quintana Lozano. She was born in Silver City, New Mexico, and is of Apache ancestry. Hank Lozano, Sr. was a golden gloves boxer in California and an exhibition boxer during the Second World War. He became a successful rancher and farmer in the Imperial Valley region of California. He died on Easter Sunday in 2009.

Henry grew up in Calexico, California and graduated from Calexico High School in 1966. There, he became friends with Enrique "Kiki" Camarena, who later became a Special Agent for the Drug Enforcement Administration (DEA). He initially attended college at Cal Poly San Luis Obispo to get his agribusiness degree, with the idea of taking a leadership role in the family farm, but it was the era of the '60s and, like many of his friends, Henry developed a problem with drug addiction.

=== Teen Challenge ===
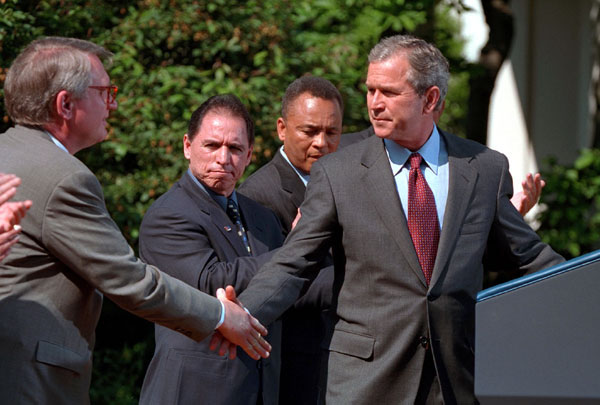
Henry Lozano with President George W. Bush at an event in the White House Rose Garden.

In 1974, Henry Lozano joined Teen Challenge, a faith-based, global ministry program for substance abuse treatment. It was an appointment with fate that would change the direction of his life toward service and volunteering. In a speech in the Rose Garden at the White House, President George W. Bush noted that Lozano is a graduate of Teen Challenge. From 1974 to 1985, Lozano served as the director of Teen Challenge in California.

The impressive results of Teen Challenge have been applauded by Presidents Reagan, George H.W. Bush, and George W. Bush. George W. Bush, who credits his Christian faith for his own victory over alcohol abuse, has praised Teen Challenge ever since he was Governor of Texas, saying it works "to change people's lives by changing their hearts."

Prior to his White House appointment, Lozano was the CEO of Californians for Drug Free Youth, Inc., a grass-roots organization he founded.

=== Native American ancestry ===
Henry Lozano is of Native American and Hispanic ancestry. In an interview with the Rockefeller Institute, he spoke about Teen Challenge and how this experience was colored by his parents' traditional values: "I walked in the Teen Challenge doors in 1974 as a student. My parents were in shock that their first-born son was so far out on a limb with drug use because I was the intended elder in my family." Because of this early experience, Lozano has championed causes at the local, national, and international level, especially those related to substance abuse prevention and recovery programs.

In 2000, he was asked to speak at "Mobilizing Parents for Prevention," a plenary session sponsored by the Office of National Drug Control Policy in the Executive Office of the President. Lozano spoke about his family heritage and the importance of the traditional values in guiding and encouraging young people to pursue a life of service and volunteerism. "My father’s side came from Chihuahua, Mexico. My mother’s side are Apache from southwestern New Mexico," he said. "These two people defined for me what I understand today to be an Honorable Son: a son of integrity, a son who responds to the honor of his father’s name, a son who treats his mother with respect. I had a father who worked seven days a week, and a mother who carried a broom seven days a week – not to sweep the floor but to crack it on our backs if we didn’t respond the way we should have while Daddy wasn’t there."

"In addition to discipline and guidance from my mother, I also got the praise and the recognition in our community," he noted. "Every time mother got up and introduced me, she would tell everybody 50% non-truth by telling them how wonderful I was. And she would tell 50% of the truth… all of those good things that I did in fact do. Why did my mother continue to promote her children in this way? Because she understood that the man she married, Enrique Lozano, was a man of integrity, a man of honor, a man of value. And to inspire that in me, she had to continue to reinforce in the public eye, in our community, that I was also a man of integrity. And what did that mean in our family? What impression did that give in our community? It gave other people the impression that her firstborn was a man who was going to carry out his father's ways, to carry on our family's honor. I understood this at an early age. t is the one thing inside of me that has held me true to course, the one thing that advanced me forward."

== USA Freedom Corps ==
In his 2002 State of the Union Address President Bush asked all Americans to dedicate two years or 4,000 hours over the course of their lives to serving others. USA Freedom Corps, as part of the Executive Office of the President of the United States, was described as a "Coordinating Council... working to strengthen our culture of service and help find opportunities for every American to start volunteering." President George W. Bush created USA Freedom Corps to build on the countless acts of service, sacrifice and generosity that followed the Sept. 11, 2001 attacks.

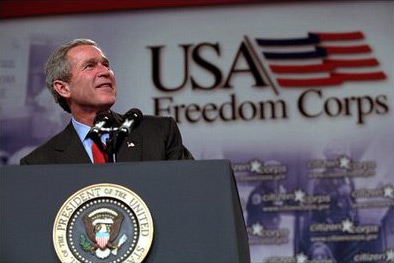
President George W. Bush speaking at a USA Freedom Corps event.

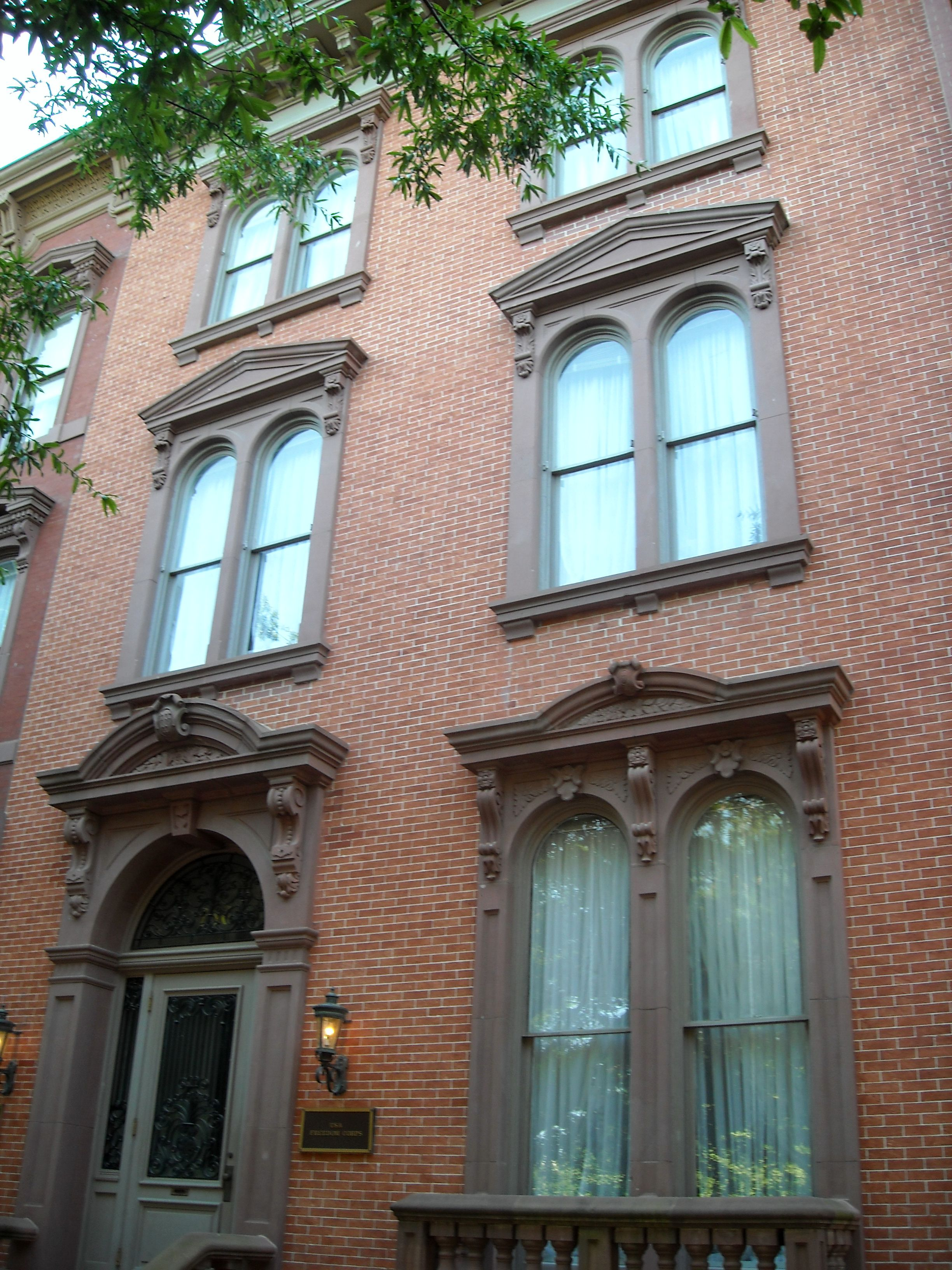
The USA Freedom Corps headquarters was on Jackson Place, across from the White House.

As Director of USA Freedom Corps, Henry Lozano worked cooperatively to orchestrate and coordinate agencies such as the Peace Corps, Citizen Corps, AmeriCorps and Senior Corps to recruit, mobilize, and encourage all Americans to engage in public service. He was charged with implementing President Bush's vision for volunteerism and creating a "culture of service" in America. Echoing the President's Call to Service which he made in his 2002 "State of the Union" address, Lozano worked to promote and expand opportunities for Americans looking to serve causes greater than themselves.

In 2003, Bush appointed Lozano as a member of the Board of Directors of the Corporation for National and Community Service. He was recognized by the White House as "a leader for his service to our nation." He has worked over the course of his career to ensure Americans understand the value of volunteerism. On September 11, 2007, the date of Lozano's appointment, Stephen Goldsmith, Chairman of the Board of the Corporation for National and Community Service, said "Henry Lozano has devoted his life to grassroots action and citizen problem-solving."

== Red Ribbon Week ==
In 1985, Henry Lozano, along with the Californian's for Drug Free Youth Board of Directors, created the first Statewide Red Ribbon Campaign in memory of his high school friend, Enrique "Kiki" Camarena, a Drug Enforcement Administration special agent. While serving in the line of duty, Camarena was tragically murdered by drug traffickers. With the support of Congressman Duncan Hunter and City Councilman David Dhillon, Lozano helped to create and promote "Camarena Clubs" in Imperial Valley, California, Camarena's home. Hundreds of club members pledged to lead drug-free lives to honor the sacrifices made by Camarena and others on behalf of all Americans. From these clubs emerged the Red Ribbon Week campaign, and during the administration of President Bill Clinton it grew into a nationwide service effort that touched the lives of millions of school-aged children.

Henry Lozano with young guests from Calexico High School in California, where the Red Ribbon Campaign began in 1985.

The U.S. Drug Enforcement Administration's website says that: "Red Ribbon Week is nationally recognized and celebrated, helping to preserve Special Agent Camarena’s memory and further the cause for which he gave his life. The Red Ribbon Campaign also became a symbol of support for the DEA's efforts to reduce demand for drugs through prevention and education programs. By wearing a red ribbon during the last week in October, Americans demonstrate their ardent opposition to drugs. They pay homage not only to Special Agent Camarena, but to all men and women who have made the ultimate sacrifice in support of our nation’s struggle against drug trafficking and abuse."

According to the DEA, approximately 80 million people participate in Red Ribbon events every year.

== Youth To Youth ==
Henry Lozano was president and CEO of Californians for Drug-free Youth (CAFDY), a non-profit organization working to bring parents, youth, schools and communities together to create and support safe and healthy communities (from 1996 to 2007).

At CADFY, Lozano actively supported the "Youth to Youth" movement. Youth to Youth originated in Columbus, Ohio as a high school program in 1982. Its goal is to support and encourage teens to be drug-free. Since 1987, CADFY has sponsored over 300 Youth to Youth conferences in 35 communities throughout California.

Youth to Youth is intended to impower young people to become leaders, focusing its programs on issues that teens are most likely to face while growing up today, such as drugs, alcohol and smoking, negative peer pressure, depression, bullying, relationships, body image, self-concept, and community responsibility. By learning how to spread the message of positive lifestyle choices, teens involved in Youth to Youth are supposed to be able to find their own paths which is what the Youth to Youth foundation sees as something that is needed for a more peaceful and harmonious world.

== National Volunteer Week ==
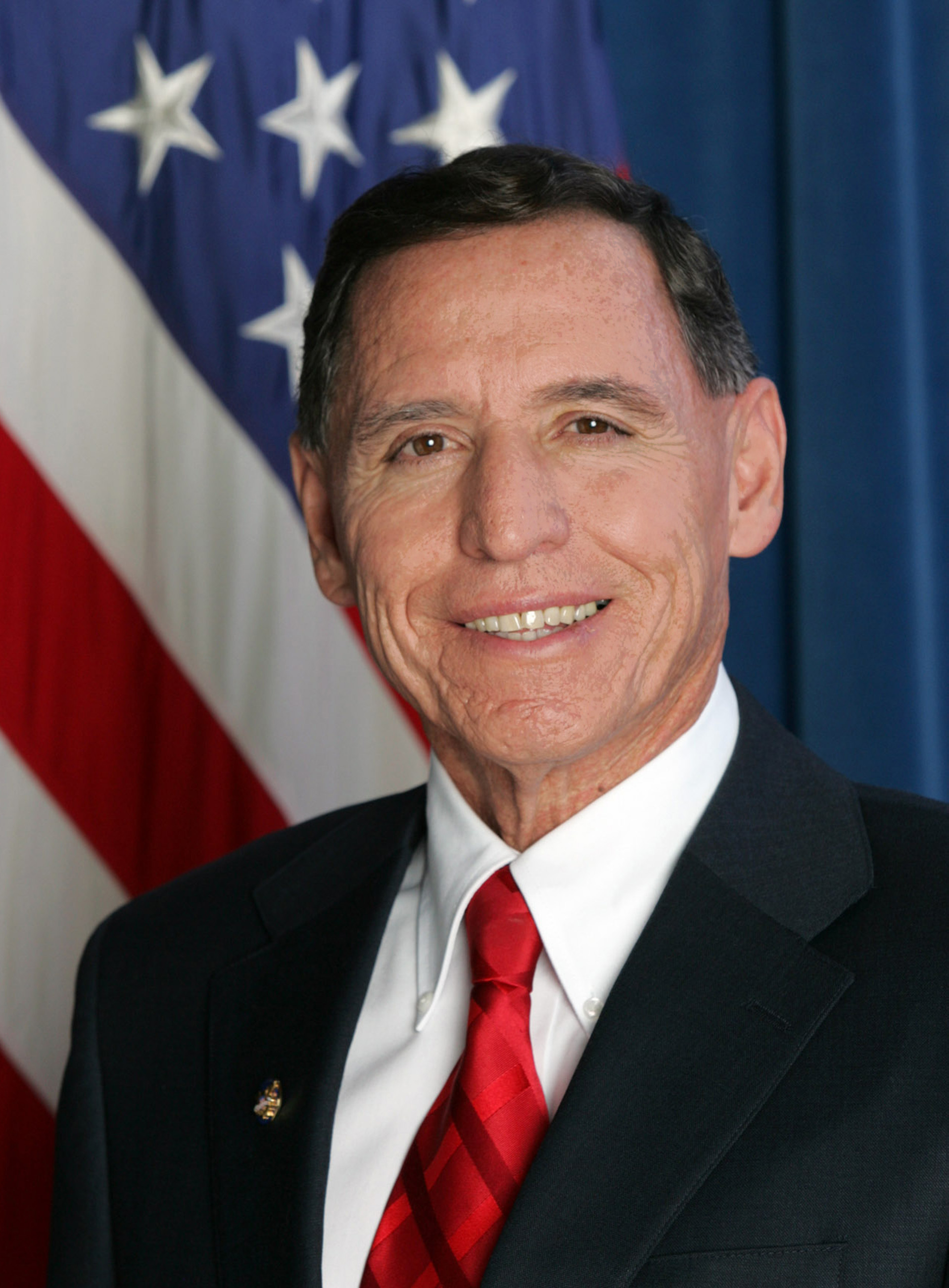
Official portrait of Henry Lozano.

On April 29, 2008, Henry Lozano joined President George W. Bush at the White House for a celebration of "National Volunteer Week" and an event honoring Americans who give of their time to help the less fortunate and create impact in communities at home and around the globe. "I believe strongly in the admonition, 'To whom much is given, much is required'," President Bush said. "Those of you here today are living up to that noble calling. And you carry on the best traditions of American citizenship." During an East Room ceremony, President Bush recognized 33 Peace Corps trainees preparing to leave for Guatemala and thanked them for dedicating their lives to serving others. This tradition of hosting Peace Corps volunteers for a formal White House send-off before the trainees leave for their service has been continued by every sitting President since Richard Nixon.

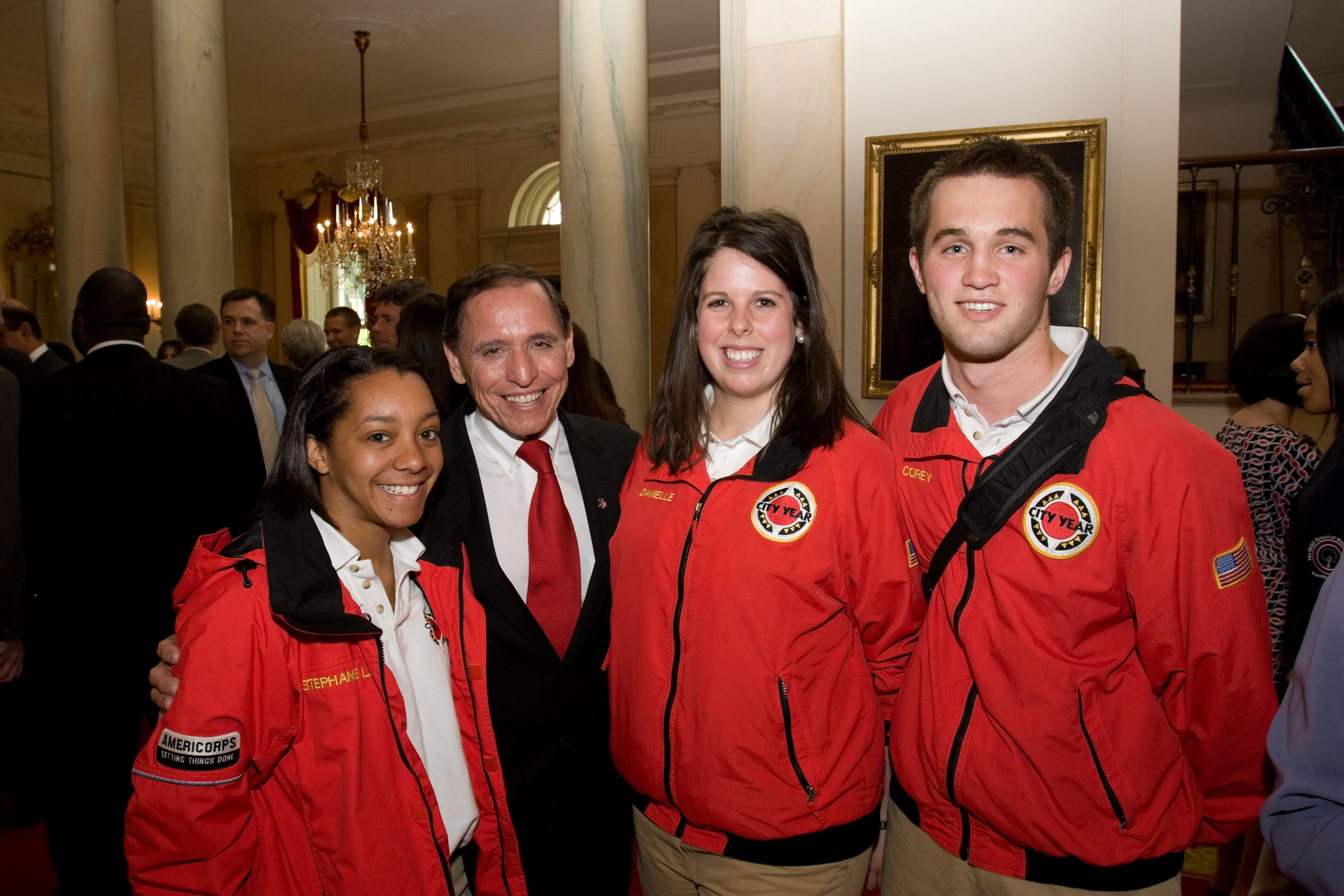
Henry Lozano with AmeriCorps City Year members at a National Volunteer Week event in the East Room of the White House. (Photo by M. T. Harmon, CNCS)

In conjunction with the White House event, Lozano was interviewed on "Ask the White House," an online interactive forum that allowed the public to interact with Cabinet Secretaries, Senior White House Officials, behind-the-scenes professionals at the White House, and others.

On the day before the White House event, Director Lozano joined the President's Council on Service and Civic Participation, the Boys & Girls Club of Greater Washington, and the Corporation for National and Community Service for an event to recognize youth volunteers with the President's Volunteer Service Award for their exemplary community service. The event also launched a new online toolkit, "Youth Engaged in Service: How and Why to Incorporate Volunteer Projects into Your Youth Program", to engage youth from disadvantaged circumstances in volunteer service. The free online toolkit is published at: www.presidentialserviceawards.gov/yes.

== The President's Volunteer Service Awards ==
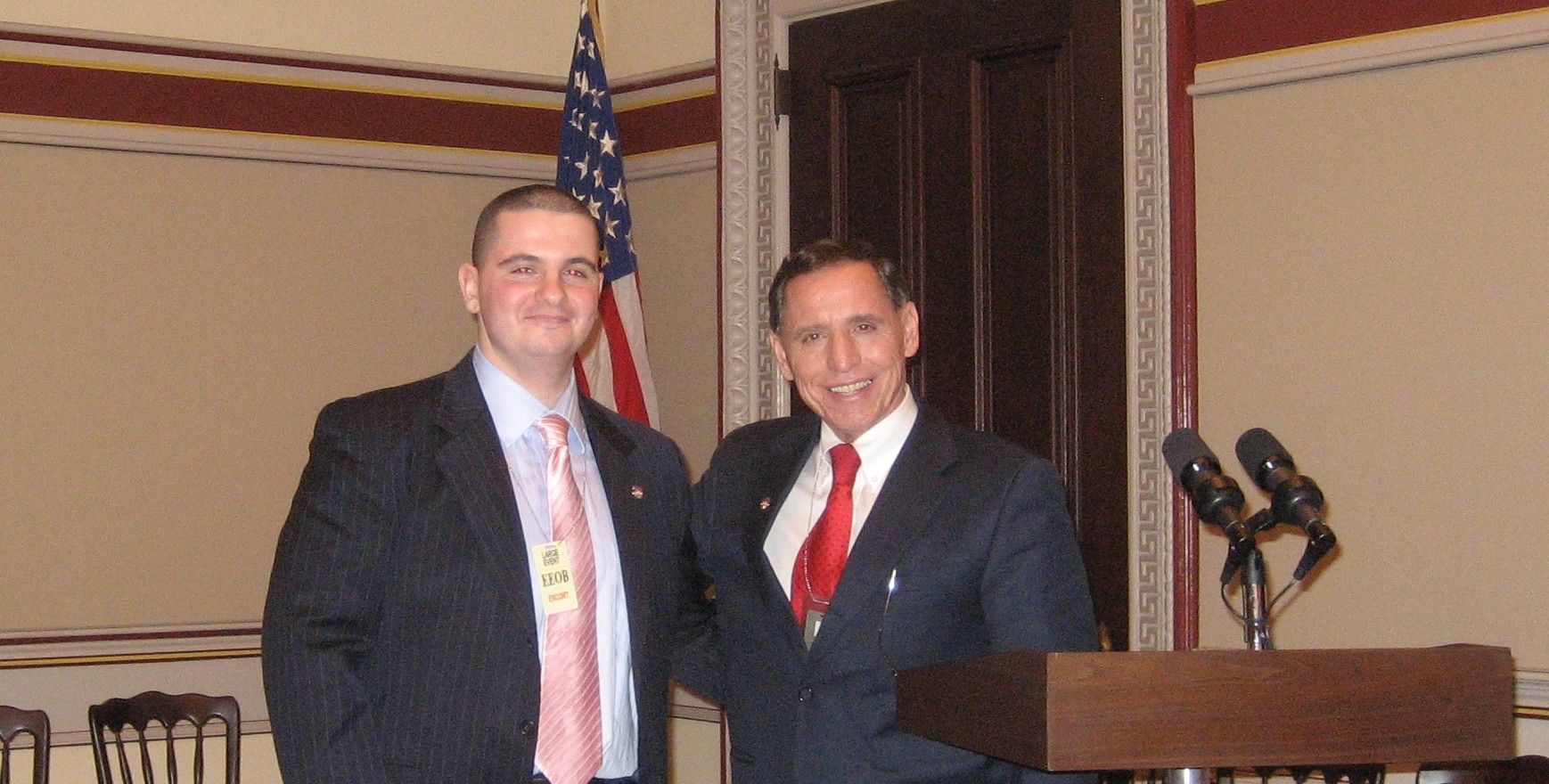
Lozano at a White House event with Jay Goldman, recipient of the President's "Call to Service Award."

On May 16, 2008, USA Freedom Corps Director Lozano joined Marine General James E. Cartwright, Vice Chairman of the Joint Chiefs of Staff, along with Mary Jo Myers, a member of the President's Council on Service and Civic Participation, and actor Stephen Baldwin in presenting USA Freedom Corps President's Volunteer Service Awards to seven outstanding members of the armed services. The event took place at the Eisenhower Executive Office Building (EEOB) located next to the West Wing of the White House. "Even though they come from different services and different military components, they have one thing in common: Early in their life, they decided to serve," General Cartwright said. "The recipients are the type of people who devote themselves to their communities. They are the type of behind-the-scenes people who end up (becoming) mayors and policemen (and women)." In January 2003, the President's Council on Service and Civic Participation was established as an initiative of USA Freedom Corps.

== ¡Soy Unica! ¡Soy Latina! ==
Henry Lozano launches ¡Soy Unica! ¡Soy Latina! with Charles Curie of SAMHSA, Florida's First Lady Columba Bush, and former U.S. Surgeon General Antonia Novello, M.D. (photo courtesy of VANIDADES magazine.)

In 2002, Lozano helped design the support materials for "¡Soy Unica! ¡Soy Latina!" an initiative designed to help Latinas age 9 to 14, their mothers, and other caregivers to build self-esteem, improve mental health, decision-making skills, and assertiveness to prevent the abuse of alcohol, tobacco, and illicit drugs. SAMHSA joined with the Hispanic/Latino community to develop educational materials for the initiative.

The program, sponsored by SAMHSA (at the U. S. Department of Health and Human Services) and leaders of the Hispanic/Latino community, garnered the support and participation of two prominent Latina community leaders: Florida's First Lady Columba Bush (Governor Jeb Bush's wife) and New York State Health Commissioner and former U.S. Surgeon General Antonia Novello, M.D., agreed to serve as "Madrinas" (godmothers, mentors, spokespersons) for the campaign, whose title translates as "I am unique! I am Latina!"

According to SAMHSA's 2001 National Household Survey on Drug Abuse, a significant number of Latinas turn to alcohol and illicit drugs. Almost one in five Latinas age 12 to 17 reported past-year illicit drug use. More than one in four reported lifetime use of an illicit drug. Almost one-third, 31 percent, reported past-year alcohol use and 17 percent reported past-year use of cigarettes. Other studies have found Hispanic girls rank higher in rates of pregnancy, depression, and suicide than any other racial or ethnic group.

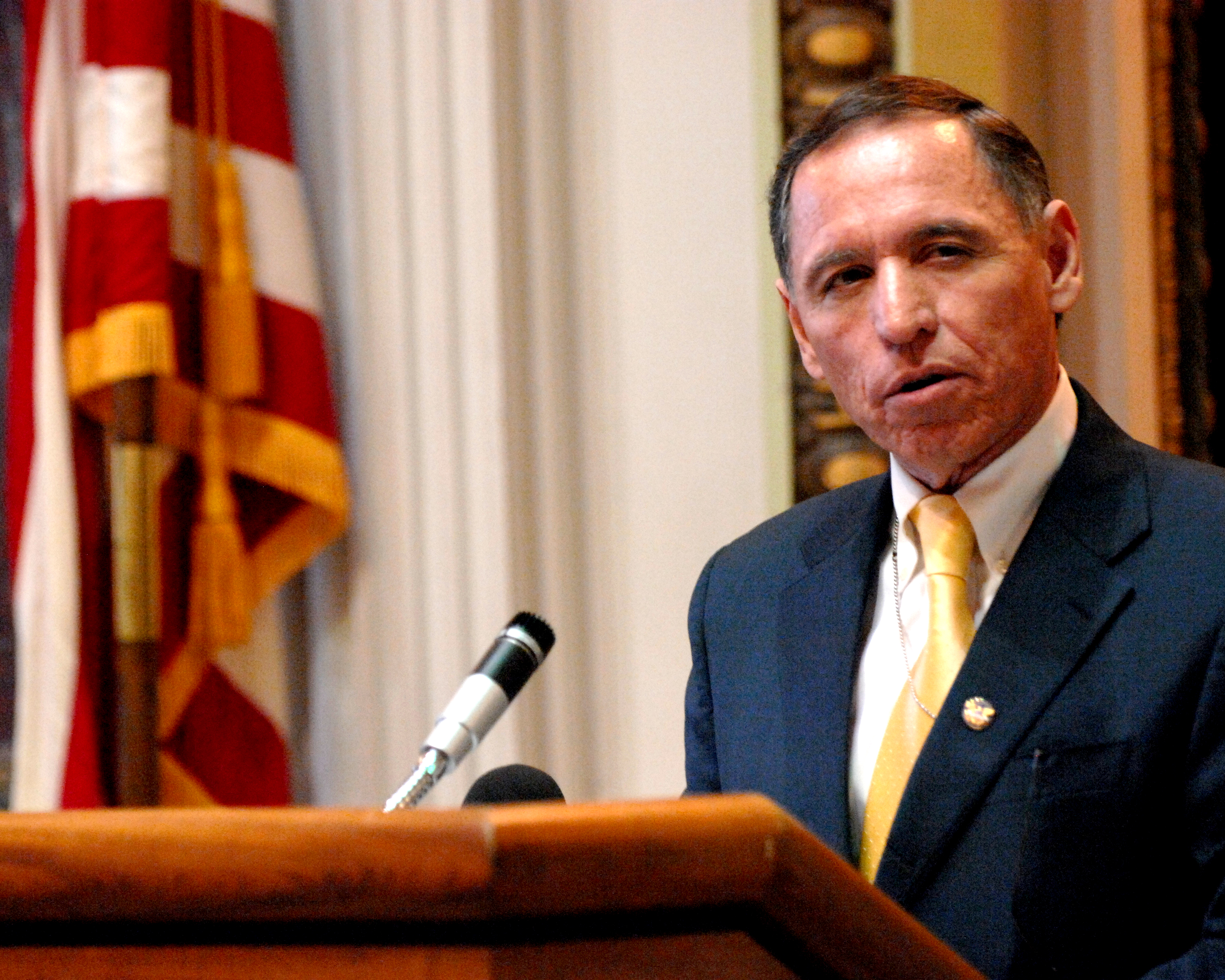
Henry Lozano speaks at President's Volunteer Service Awards event, the West Wing of the White House.

The initiative was kicked off at "A Rally To Remember" at South Miami Middle School on October 19, 2002. Lozano joined Mrs. Bush, Dr. Novello, and SAMHSA Administrator Charles G. Curie, an event to encourage hundreds of Latinas to celebrate their heritage and prevent the use of alcohol, tobacco, and illicit drugs. "We have joined with the Hispanic/Latino community to help parents send a clear and consistent message to their children – that drugs are illegal, dangerous, and addictive," said Charles Curie. "The key is talking with our children early and often."

== Fundraising for faith-based groups ==
In the Rockefeller Institute interview, Lozano addressed the issue of getting federal funding for faith-based groups. He pointed out the fact that local congregations, mosques, temples and foundations have their own constituent groups that are their support systems and their financial bases. "Within that context, you have these wonderful basins of resources that do not need outside funding to continue what they are doing already," he said.

Henry Lozano with Mayor Tom Truex of Davie, Florida at a Teen Challenge event.

"For instance, when I worked at Teen Challenge, my job as executive director was to generate money. Every dollar raised was private money," he said. "There is a reason for that. Teen Challenge is totally faith-saturated, which means, in most cases, there is nothing that can be federally funded because the whole system is faith-saturated. There was no way an organization like Teen Challenge could leverage federal or state dollars because those dollars cannot be used for the delivery of service, or for technology, that is faith-centered or spiritual. It is important for organizations like Teen Challenge to understand that their best and most secure funding is local and private."

== National Alcohol and Drug Addiction Recovery Month ==
On April 2, 2003, Lozano, while serving as Co-Chair President's Advisory Commission on Drug-Free Communities, was interviewed for a webcast by Ivette A. Torres, Associate Director for Consumer Affairs at the Center for Substance Abuse Treatment at U.S. Health and Human Services (SAMHSA). The program, timed to commemorate National Alcohol & Drug Addiction Recovery Month, highlighted innovative programs "in our nation’s continuing effort to make substance abuse treatment available to everyone who needs it."

== Service ==
=== National ===
While he was a director of Corporation for National and Community Service (CNCS), Lozano also served as a Commissioner for President George W. Bush's Advisory Commission on Drug Free Communities in the Office of National Drug Control Policy. During that time, he actively promoted the President's "Access to Recovery" initiative, a competitive grant program providing federal funds to states and tribal governments for voucher programs that expand access to a range of effective substance abuse clinical treatment and recovery support services, including those provided by faith and community-based programs.

Under Lozano's leadership, George H.W. Bush named the Santa Ynez Valley Network for Drug-free Youth, Inc. one of the top ten drug prevention coalitions in the United States, at the President's National Leadership Forum in Washington.

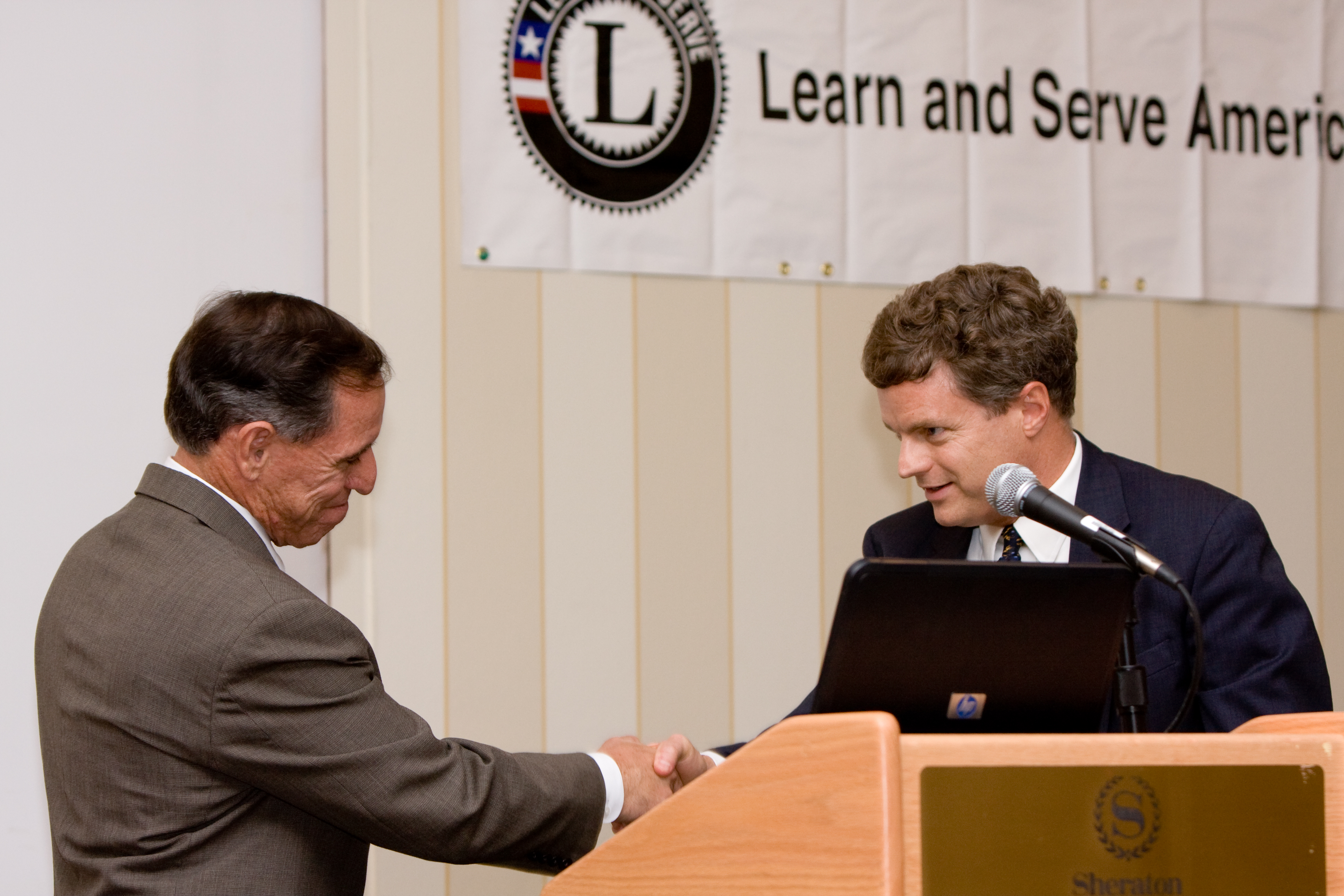
Henry Lozano is introduced by John Bridgeland, the first Director of USA Freedom Corps. (Photo by M. T. Harmon, CNCS)

Lozano served on the Steering Committee Partners for Recovery at the U.S. Department of Health and Human Services (HHS), and on the National Advisory Council of the Substance Abuse and Mental Health Services Administration's (SAMHSA) Center for Substance Abuse Prevention. He also served as a board member of the Community Anti-Drug Coalitions of America (CADCA). Lozano also served as a presidential elector (member of the Electoral College) from the state of California in 2000.

In 2008, Lozano served on the National Advisory Commission on the creation and launch of The LEAGUE, a service and volunteering organization dedicated to making "service to the community as popular in our schools as sports."

=== California ===
California Governor Arnold Schwarzenegger announcing the first-ever state-level Cabinet position for Service and Volunteering.

In 2004, Lozano was appointed by Governor Arnold Schwarzenegger to serve as a member of the Stakeholders’ Steering Committee for the California Access to Recovery Effort (C.A.R.E.) in service to Kathryn P. Jett, Director of California State Department of Alcohol and Drug Programs. In 2002, Governor Arnold Schwarzenegger appointed Lozano to serve Kathryn P. Jett, Director of California State Department of Alcohol and Drug Programs as a member of the Director's Prevention Advisory Council.

In 2008 Schwarzenegger created the first-in-nation state-level cabinet position for service and volunteering. "Government can give direction, it can provide an impetus, but real change has to come from each and every one of us," the Governor said. "We must do everything we can to harness this incredible resource." Barack Obama, in the race for the presidency, praised Governor Schwarzenegger's courageous move, saying, "At this defining moment in our history, the Governor's decision to elevate civic engagement to such an important level reminds us that the call to serve is one that transcends partisanship and has the power to unite this generation around a common purpose."

=== Personal life ===
Henry met his wife Paulette Nagle in 1999 while she was deputy to the director of prevention services for the State of California Alcohol and Drug Programs, a position to which she was appointed by Governor Pete Wilson. The couple was married in a traditional Native American wedding ceremony at the Warm Springs reservation (Oregon) on Easter Sunday, 2004. Henry and Paulette currently live in Long Beach, California.
