= Medical Reserve Corps =

American Organization

Medical Reserve Corp
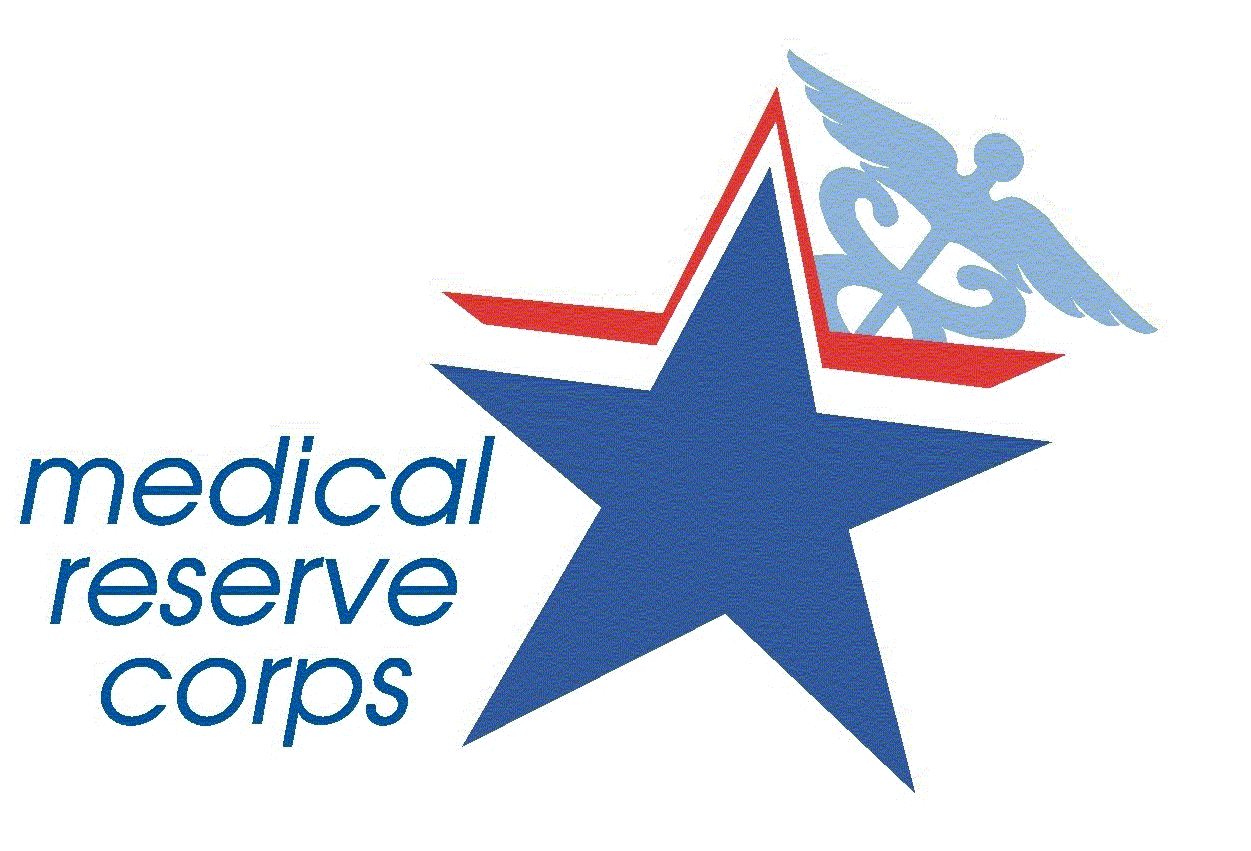
- Formation: 2006
- Headquarters: Washington, DC
- Assistant Secretary for Preparedness and Response: Dawn O'Connell
- Website: https://aspr.hhs.gov/MRC/Pages/index.aspx

The Medical Reserve Corps (MRC) is a network in the U.S. of community-based units initiated and established by local organizations aimed at meeting the public health needs of their communities. It is sponsored by the Administration for Strategic Preparedness and Response (ASPR) of the United States Department of Health and Human Services (HHS). The MRC consists of medical and non-medical volunteers who contribute to local health initiatives, such as activities meeting the Surgeon General's priorities for public health, and supplement existing response capabilities in times of emergency. The MRC provides the structure necessary to pre-identify, credential, train, and activate medical and public health volunteers.

The Medical Reserve Corps Program (MRC PO) is the national "clearinghouse for information and guidance to help communities establish, implement, and sustain MRC units nationwide."

As of January 2020, there are 839 local MRC units and 175,283 volunteers. MRC units are present in all 50 U.S. states, Washington, D.C., Guam, Palau, Puerto Rico, and the U.S. Virgin Islands.

== History ==
Following the September 11th attacks in 2001, President George W. Bush called for the establishment of the USA Freedom Corps, a "Coordinating Council... working to strengthen our culture of service and help find opportunities for every American to start volunteering". The Freedom Corps was to have three components: responding to crisis, rebuilding communities, and sharing compassion with the world. The Medical Reserve Corps was created as an extension of the Freedom Corps. As of 2017, there are 957 active MRC units.

== Affiliations ==
The MRC is a partner program of Citizen Corps, a national network of volunteers dedicated to ensuring hometown security. Citizen Corps, along with the Corporation for National and Community Service and the Peace Corps, are part of the President's USA Freedom Corps.

The MRC PO also has a cooperative agreement with the National Association of County and City Health Officials (NACCHO). This agreement enables NACCHO to assist the ASPR's Medical Reserve Corps Program Office in enhancing MRC units' ability to meet local, state, and national needs through collaboration, coordination, and capacity-building activities. These activities include:

- Coordinating the distribution of grant funding
- Developing a national marketing strategy
- Publishing a quarterly national newsletter
- Assisting in the planning of regional and national meetings
- Developing materials, resources, and tools to strengthen the knowledge and skills of MRC members

In addition, NACCHO's relationship with almost 3,000 local health departments further serves as an avenue to promote the MRC program at the local level.

== Local and national organization ==
Locally, each MRC unit is led by an MRC Unit Director and/or Coordinator, who matches community needs with volunteer capabilities. Local MRC leaders are also responsible for building partnerships, ensuring the sustainability of the local unit, and managing resources. Partnerships typically include local public health and emergency response agencies, community businesses, and neighboring MRC's. Local MRC units are typically housed under Health Departments or other local governmental organizations.

Nationally, the MRC is guided by the Medical Reserve Corps Program Office, housed in the HHS ASPR Office of Emergency Management. The MRC Program Office serves as a clearinghouse for information and best practices to help communities establish, implement, and maintain MRC units nationwide. It is authorized by the Public Health Service Act, Sec. 2813 42 U.S.C. 300hh-15, and its budget has been $6 million per year, reduced to $3.9 million in FY 2020 and FY 2021. It sponsors an annual leadership conference, hosts a Web site, and coordinates with local, state, regional, and national organizations and agencies to help communities' preparedness. There are also Regional Coordinators (RCs) in all ten of the Department of Health and Human Services regions.

Many states have appointed State MRC Coordinators to help plan, organize and integrate MRC activities within the State. The MRC Program Office staff and the RCs collaborate with the State Coordinators to better integrate with local and state planning and response activities. All local MRC units are encouraged to collaborate with State Coordinators.

=== Skills and training ===
Members include doctors, nurses, mental health counselors, health educators, and other medically trained people, as well as people without medical training, including administrators, chaplains, drivers, interpreters, logistics specialists, radio operators, trainers, etc. Members receive free training in emergency response and decide how many hours they are willing to volunteer each year.

Local chapters can verify credentials to be ready for emergencies, or use the Emergency System for Advanced Registration of Volunteer Health Professionals. Liability insurance varies by state.

=== Local activities ===
Members do activities and training on their own time, which may be outside working hours, or time off work arranged with their employer. Activities include, but are not limited to:

- Supporting local public health while also advancing the priorities of the U.S. Surgeon General; which are to promote disease prevention, improve health literacy, eliminate health disparities, and enhance public health preparedness
- Emergency Sheltering
- Disaster Medical Support and Mass-Casualty Incidents
- Assisting local hospitals, clinics, and health departments with surge personnel needs
- Participating in mass prophylaxis and vaccination exercises and community disaster drills
- Training with local emergency response partners
- Providing first aid services for fundraising and other events
