= White House Office of Mail and Messenger Operations =

The Office of Executive Mail Operations was established by Executive Order 12044 signed by President Jimmy Carter on December 27, 1977. The current director is Kevin R. Cariato.

== Mission ==
The organization's mission is to provide White House Mail and Messenger services to all entities of the Executive Office of the President, including direct support services to the President of the United States. The services include direct messenger delivery, incoming and outgoing mail analysis, screening, sorting and distribution. The Director reports directly to the Director of Administration.

== History ==
The Executive Office of the President (EOP) officially moved into the EEOB in 1947 after the last of the original occupants, the State Department, moved out. The first EOP entities to move into the old State Building (as the EEOB was known) were the Bureau of the Budget (now the Office of Administration and Office of Executive Mail Operations) and the National Security council.

On December 12, 1977, President Carter issued Executive Order 12028 that merged the administrative functions of ten entities of the EOP, to be consolidated as the Office of Administration (OA), which includes the Office of Executive Mail Operations.
