= Action Without Borders =

Charities based in New York state

Action Without Borders (Idealist.org)
- Formation: 1995
- Location: New York, USA
- Exec. Director: Ami Dar
- Website: www.idealist.org

Action Without Borders, also known as Idealist, is a non-profit service organization based in New York City, founded in 1995 by Ami Dar. The group has offices in the United States and Argentina. In 2023, 45,000 nonprofit and charitable organizations worldwide are registered on the site and gets 35,000 visitors a day.

On January 14, 2025, it was announced that Idealist and VolunteerMatch are merging.

== History ==
Founder Ami Dar was interested in solving social and environmental problems in the world since childhood.

In 1985, after his mandatory army service in the Israel Defense Forces, while Dar was traveling in South America, he got the idea to use modern technology (phones, PCs, and fax machines) to build a network that would make it easier for people to connect and act on issue that concerned them. Dar was 24 at the time.

By 1995, Dar had founded an early iteration of Idealist, initially called The Contact Center Network. They sponsored meeting spaces in several communities where people could connect with neighbors who might share interests and ideas for local action. In 1996, Action Without Borders launched the site, idealist.org.

In 2016, Idealist closed its Portland, Oregon office, laying off two-dozen people who worked there.

== Notable people ==
Ami Dar (Hebrew: עמי דר; born January 7, 1961) is the founder and executive director of Action Without Borders. Dar was born January 7, 1961, in Jerusalem, the eldest of three children, to a schoolteacher mother and diplomat father. He grew up in Peru and Mexico, and it was in Mexico City where he first became aware of the contrast of wealth and poverty around him, which started him on a path of dedication to social justice. In 1976, Dar and his family returned to Israel and from 1979 to 1982, he completed his mandatory service as a paratrooper. In 1988, Dar joined Aladdin Knowledge Systems, a software company based in Tel Aviv. From 1988 to 1992 he served as the international marketing manager. In 1992, he was named president and he relocated to New York City to establish their North American branch..

== See also ==
- Community service
- Civic engagement
