= Citizen Corps =

Program under the Department of Homeland Security

Citizen Corps is a program under the Department of Homeland Security, founded in 2002 as part of the USA Freedom Corps, that provides training for the population of the United States to assist in the recovery after a disaster or terrorist attack. Each local Citizen Corps Council partners with organizations, volunteers and businesses to organize responders, volunteers and professional first responders for an efficient response so efforts are not wasted by being duplicated. By training in Incident Command, volunteers know whom to report to and how the incident is organized. This prevents sites from being inundated by untrained and unprepared personnel preventing operation. Citizen Corps also works in conjunction with the Corporation for National and Community Service in promoting national service opportunities for promoting homeland security needs.

== Citizen Corps Councils ==
The Department of Homeland Security coordinates the overall effort of helping communities establish local Citizen Corps Councils and programs. The memberships of these councils may include emergency managers and first responders; volunteer community service, and faith- and community-based organizations; schools, hospitals, private businesses, neighborhoods, and individual citizens. Citizen Corps Councils exist at the national, state, territorial, local, and tribal levels of government. Citizen Corps Councils build on the successful efforts that are in place in many communities around the country to prevent crime and respond to emergencies. Programs that started through local innovation are the foundation for Citizen Corps and this national approach to citizen participation in community safety. The responsibilities of the Citizen Corps Councils are as follows:

- Educate the public on safety, help citizens take an active role in protecting themselves from harm, and teach citizens what to do in the event of a crisis.
- Spearhead efforts to offer citizens new and existing volunteer opportunities, educational information, and training courses to address crime, terrorism, and natural disaster risks.
- Promote all Citizen Corps programs and activities across the community.
- Capture innovative practices and report accomplishments that can be replicated in other communities nationwide.
- Survey the community to assess increased awareness and Citizen Corps participation.

== The Citizen Corps Partner Programs ==
The Department of Homeland Security, the Department of Justice, and the Department of Health and Human Services jointly administer five programs through Citizen Corps: CERT, Fire Corps, Neighborhood Watch, MRC, and VIPS.

=== CERT: Community Emergency Response Teams ===
Specially administered by the Department of Homeland Security, the Community Emergency Response Team (CERT) program educates the American public about disaster preparedness and sponsors training of basic emergency skills such as fire suppression, search and rescue (SAR), and handling mass casualties with triage and disaster first aid. The CERT program emphasizes working in conjunction with professional responders and community organizations to assist in emergency and event management. CERT programs are typically sponsored by local or county offices of Emergency Management. CERT programs seek to create a mindset shift within the psyche of the American public from a response culture to a preparedness culture through community outreach and education.

=== Fire Corps ===
Fire Corps seeks to bolster local fire departments with volunteer firefighters in order to more effectively contain disasters. These "citizen advocates" also assist in community fire safety outreach, youth programs, and administrative support. The Fire Corps is funded through the Department of Homeland Security and is managed and implemented by the National Volunteer Fire Council, in partnership with the International Association of Fire Fighters, the International Association of Fire Chiefs, and other groups that make up the National Advisory Committee.

=== Neighborhood Watch ===
An expanded National Neighborhood Watch Program incorporates terrorism awareness education into its existing crime prevention mission, while also serving as a way to bring residents together to focus on emergency preparedness and emergency response training. Funded by DOJ, the National Neighborhood Watch Program is administered by the National Sheriffs' Association.

=== MRC: Medical Reserve Corps ===
The Medical Reserve Corps (MRC) Program strengthens communities by helping medical, public health and other volunteers offer their expertise throughout the year as well as during local emergencies and other times of community need. MRC volunteers work in coordination with existing local emergency response programs and also supplement existing community public health initiatives, such as outreach and prevention, immunization programs, blood drives, case management, care planning, and other efforts. The MRC program is administered by HHS.

=== VIPS: Volunteers in Police Program ===
Volunteers in Police Service (VIPS) works to enhance the capacity of state and local law enforcement to utilize volunteers. VIPS serves as a gateway to resources and information for and about law enforcement volunteer programs. Funded by DOJ, VIPS is managed and implemented by International Association of Chiefs of Police.

== Affiliated organizations ==
The Citizen Corps Affiliate Program expands the resources and materials available to states and local communities by partnering with Programs and Organizations that offer resources for public education, outreach, and training; represent volunteers interested in helping to make their community safer; or offer volunteer service opportunities to support first responders, disaster relief activities, and community safety efforts.

The following previously existing non-governmental preparedness programs are partners in the Citizen Corps Program:

=== The American Association of Community Colleges ===
The American Association of Community Colleges is the primary advocacy organization for the nation's community colleges, representing almost 1,200 two-year institutions and more than 11 million students. Nationally, community colleges enroll almost half (46%) of all U.S. undergraduates. Community colleges have taken the lead in Homeland Security Education, with over 80% of police, fire and EMTs receiving their credentials from these institutions. AACC supports their membership through policy initiatives, innovative programs, research and information, professional development and other efforts.

=== The American Legion ===
Given a congressional charter in 1919, The American Legion serves as an advocate for American's veterans, a friend of the U.S. military, a sponsor of community-based programs for young people, and a spokesman for patriotic values. Nearly 2.7 million men and women who served in the U.S. military during an official period of conflict are members, making The American Legion the nation's largest veterans groups, with approximately 14,500 American Legion Posts worldwide.

=== The American Legion Auxiliary ===
The American Legion Auxiliary is the largest patriotic women's service organization in the world, with nearly 1 million members. Affiliated with The American Legion and chartered by Congress in 1920, the Auxiliary is a veterans service organization with members in nearly 10,000 American communities. The organization sponsors volunteer programs on the national and local levels, focusing on three major areas: veterans, young people and the community.

=== ARC: American Red Cross ===
For more than 122 years, the mission of the American Red Cross has been to help people prevent, prepare for, and respond to emergencies. A humanitarian organization led by volunteers, guided by its Congressional Charter and the Fundamental Principles of the International Red Cross Movement, the ARC is woven into the fabric of our communities with 940 chapters nationwide. In fulfilling its mission, ARC is empowering Americans to take practical steps to make families, neighbourhoods, schools and workplaces safer, healthier and more resilient in the face of adversity. Through the Together We Prepare program, the ARC provides training for the public in community disaster preparedness and response; and lifesaving skills training (First Aid and CPR). The program also encourages people to donate blood and volunteer to help build community preparedness.

=== ARRL: American Radio Relay League ===
The American Radio Relay League is a non-commercial membership association of amateur radio operators organized for the promotion of interest in Amateur Radio communication and experimentation, for the establishment of networks to provide communications in the event of disasters or other emergencies, for the advancement of the public welfare, for the representation of the Radio Amateur in legislative and regulatory matters. ARRL is the principal organization representing the interests of the more than 650,000 U.S. Radio Amateurs. Because of its organized emergency communications capability, ARRL's Amateur Radio Emergency Service (ARES) can be of valuable assistance in providing critical and essential communications during emergencies and disasters when normal lines of communications are disrupted. ARRL conducts emergency communications training and certifies proficiency in emergency communications skills.

=== Association of Public Television Stations (APTS) ===
The Association of Public Television Stations is a nonprofit membership organization established in 1980 to support the continued growth and development of a strong and financially sound non-commercial television service for the American public. APTS provides advocacy for public television interests at the national level, as well as consistent leadership and information in marshaling support for its members: the nation's 356 public television stations.

=== Civil Air Patrol ===
Civil Air Patrol is a congressionally chartered, non-profit corporation and is the civilian auxiliary of the U.S. Air Force available to any department or agency in any branch of the Federal Government. Its corporate purposes include being an organization to encourage and develop by example the voluntary contribution of private citizens to the public welfare and to provide private citizens with adequate facilities to assist in meeting local and national emergencies. It does this, in part, by providing aerospace education, cadet training, and emergency response services through 1,600 local units nationwide. CAP supports Homeland Security efforts through memoranda of understanding with various federal, state and local government agencies under which its volunteer members provide air/ground search and rescue, air/ground observation, radio communications and relay, air-to-ground photography, and disaster and damage assessment assets.

=== E9-1-1 Institute ===
E9-1-1 Institute is a non-profit organization that supports the Congressional E9-1-1 Caucus in promoting public education on E9-1-1 and emergency communications issues. The Congressional E9-1-1 Caucus was formed as a joint initiative to educate lawmakers, constituents, and committees about the importance of citizen-activated emergency response systems. E9-1-1 Institute serves as an information clearinghouse for policy makers at the federal, state, and local levels, as well as for interested parties and the general public. E-911 Institute is supported through member donations.

=== EPA: Environmental Protection Agency ===
The United States Environmental Protection Agency's (EPA) mission is to protect public health and to safeguard the natural environment. EPA provides leadership in the area of chemical safety through State Emergency Response Commissions (SERCs) and Local Emergency Planning Committees (LEPCs), which receive, manage, and use information about chemical hazards in the community to make residents safer.

=== Home Safety Council ===
The Home Safety Council is a non-profit organization dedicated to helping prevent the nearly 21 million medical visits that occur on average each year from unintentional injuries in the home. Through national programs and partners across America, the HSC works to educate and empower families to take actions that help keep them safer in and around their homes. Through its charitable and educational projects, the HSC works with national safety-related organizations, home products suppliers, school systems, local fire departments, and volunteers across the country to improve home safety.

=== Meals on Wheels Association of America ===
Meals on Wheels Association of America is the oldest and largest organization in the United States representing those who provide meal services to people in need. MOWAA works toward the social, physical, nutritional, and economic betterment of vulnerable Americans. With the guiding principle to help those men and women who are elderly, homebound, disabled, frail, or at risk, MOWAA provides the tools and information its state and local programs need to make a difference in the lives of others. It also gives cash grants to local senior meal programs throughout the country to assist in providing meals and other nutrition services.

=== Mercy Medical Airlift ===
Mercy Medical Airlift is a non-profit organization dedicated to providing charitable, long-distance air transportation ensuring patient access to distant specialized medical evaluation, diagnosis, and treatment. MMA is totally supported through charitable giving and the services of volunteer pilots and office assistants. Volunteer pilots link with other pilots nationally - together flying multiple thousands of needy patients each year. In times of emergency, volunteer pilots working within the Homeland Security Emergency Air Transportation System (HSEATS) program stand ready to transport small priority cargo and key emergency management personnel to needed destinations.

=== myGoodDeed.org ===
The nonprofit MyGoodDeed championed the effort to make September 11 a National Day of Service.

=== National Association for Search and Rescue ===
The National Association for Search and Rescue is a non-profit membership association dedicated to advancing professional, literary, and scientific knowledge in search and rescue and related fields. NASAR is composed of thousands of paid and non-paid professionals interested in all aspects of search and rescue throughout the United States and around the world. NASAR has trained over 30,000 responders since 1989 utilizing its internationally respected SARTECH© Certification Program. NASAR is dedicated to ensuring that volunteers (non-paid professionals) in search and rescue are as prepared as the career public safety personnel (fire, law and emergency medical services) with whom they work on a daily basis.

=== National Crime Prevention Council ===
The National Crime Prevention Council mission is to enable people to create safer and more caring communities by addressing the causes of crime and violence and reducing the opportunities for crime to occur. NCPC publishes books, kits of camera-ready program materials, posters, and informational and policy reports on a variety of crime prevention and community-building subjects and hosts websites that offer crime prevention tips for individuals and communities. NCPC offers training, technical assistance, and a national focus for crime prevention: it acts as secretariat for the Crime Prevention Coalition of America. It operates demonstration programs in schools, neighborhoods, and entire jurisdictions and takes a major leadership role in youth crime prevention and youth service; it also administers the Center for Faith and Service. NCPC manages the McGruff Take A Bite Out Of Crime public service advertising campaign.

=== National Fire Protection Association ===
The National Fire Protection Association is an international non-profit organization that seeks to reduce the burden of fire and other hazards on the quality of life by providing and advocating scientifically-based consensus codes and standards, research, training, and education. The National Fire Protection Association Inc. is involved in a suit against Public.Resource.Org (PRO) over the publication of fire codes that PRO claim are in the public domain as they form part of US or state law.

=== NOAA: National Oceanic and Atmospheric Administration ===
NOAA conducts research and gathers data about the global oceans, atmosphere, space, and sun, and applies this knowledge to science and service that touch the lives of all Americans. NOAA’s National Weather Service is the primary source of weather data, forecasts and warnings for the United States. The NWS is the sole United States official voice for issuing warnings during life-threatening weather situations and operates the NOAA Weather Radio network, which broadcasts weather and other hazard warnings, watches, forecasts and post-event information 24 hours a day. See .

=== National Safety Council ===
The National Safety Council is a congressionally chartered national organization with a mission to educate and influence society to adopt safety, health, and environmental policies, practices, and procedures that prevent and mitigate human suffering and economic losses arising from preventable causes. The mission encompasses unintentional injuries on the job; highway, community and recreation safety; and all major causes of preventable injuries and deaths, including occupational and environmental health and general wellness. Along with its national advocacy, the Council carries out its mission on the community level through a network of Chapters, which are dedicated to promoting safety and health in all walks of life, 24 hours a day.

=== National Volunteer Fire Council ===
The National Volunteer Fire Council (NVFC) is a non-profit membership association representing the interests of the volunteer fire, EMS, and rescue service. The NVFC promotes and provides education and training for volunteer fire and EMS organizations, and provides representation on national standards setting committees and projects. NVFC also operates 1-800-FIRE-LINE, a toll free number which links interested citizens with volunteer emergency opportunities in their community.

=== NVOAD: National Voluntary Organizations Active in Disaster ===
The National Voluntary Organizations Active in Disaster (NVOAD) is coalition of the major national voluntary organizations that have made disaster-related work a priority. With 33 years of respected experience, the NVOAD member agencies provide skilled direct services along the continuum from disaster prevention and preparation to response, recovery and mitigation. NVOAD serves its member agencies by coordinating planning efforts, enhancing response capabilities, and, when an incident occurs, facilitating comprehensive, coordinated volunteer response in partnership with emergency managers. This cooperative effort has proven to be the most effective way for a wide variety of volunteers and organizations to work together in a crisis. Throughout the year, NVOAD members work to foster cooperation, coordination, communication and collaboration among the member agencies and with government and private sector partners.

=== Operation HOPE, Inc. ===
Operation HOPE, Inc. (OHI) is a non-profit organization providing economic education for America's inner city communities. HOPE Coalition America (HCA) is an initiative of OHI, which provides free and compassionate economic counseling to businesses and families to help them prepare for and recover from major disasters or emergencies. Created after the September 11th attack on America and supported by America's leading financial institutions, HCA serves as a resource network of banking, financial services, legal, insurance, higher education, social service, and community development professionals committed to providing practical information and tools for disaster planning and to helping those affected by disaster rebuild their financial life. One such tool is the Emergency Financial First Aid Kit (EFFAK) (PDF), which helps uses identify and organize key financial records to minimize the financial impact of a natural disaster or national emergency.

=== Points of Light Foundation and the HandsOn Network ===
Points of Light Institute was created by the merger of the Points of Light Foundation and HandsOn Network in August 2007. The result is a powerful, integrated national organization with a global focus to redefine volunteerism and civic engagement for the 21st century, putting people at the center of community problem solving. To realize this vision, Points of Light Institute operates three dynamic business units that share a mission to inspire, equip and mobilize people to take action that changes the world; HandsOn Network, Mission Fish and Civic Incubator, which provide a variety of ways for people to participate in local, national and global communities.

HandsOn Network, the leading business unit and activating, volunteer-focused arm of Points of Light Institute, creates opportunities for people and organizations to apply their interests and passions to make a difference in their communities. At the center of HandsOn Network are nearly 250 affiliates that service in all 50 states and 12 international communities in nine countries.

=== Save A Life Foundation ===
The Save A Life Foundation is a national non-profit organization that seeks to train the public in Life Supporting First Aid (LSFA), including the Heimlich maneuver, Cardio-Pulmonary Resuscitation (CPR), and the use of Automated External Defibrillators (AEDs) in order to prepare all citizens, especially children, for emergencies, accidents or disasters, whether man-made or natural.

=== United States Department of Education, Office of Safe and Drug Free Schools ===
OSDFS administers, coordinates, and recommends policy for improving the quality and excellence of programs and activities that are designed to provide financial and technical assistance for drug and violence prevention and to promote the health and well being of students in elementary and secondary schools and institutions of higher education. Additional areas of focus include student-led crime prevention; health, mental health, environmental health, and physical education programs; crisis planning and emergency planning, including natural disasters, violent incidents and terrorist acts; and programs relating to citizenship and civics education.

=== United States Junior Chamber ===
The mission of Jaycees is to provide young people the opportunity to develop personal and leadership skills through local community action and organizational involvement while expanding the Junior Chamber movement. Through local chapters, the Jaycees have a long history of building and supporting communities across the nation, from playgrounds and parks to disaster relief. In today’s environment, all Jaycees and their chapters are being called to action to help step-up America’s homeland security efforts. Through their affiliation with Citizen Corps, the Jaycees will promote the formation of local Citizen Corps Councils through local Jaycee chapter participation and will assist these Councils with implementing the programs and practices associated with Citizen Corps.

=== VFW: Veterans of Foreign Wars ===
The VFW is the nation's oldest major organization serving veterans and their communities. The 2.6 million members of the VFW and its auxiliaries have a rich tradition of enhancing the lives of millions through its community service programs and special projects. A commitment to volunteerism is a cornerstone of the VFW, with a particular focus on programs that build stronger communities by promoting education, civic pride, civic responsibility and an appreciation for America's history and traditions.

== See also ==
- National Emergency Technology Guard
