= Fire Corps =

American volunteer program

Fire Corps is an American volunteer program which is designed to connect community members with their local fire/EMS departments to help with non-emergency tasks. This includes fire prevention education, administration, providing canteen services at incidents, vehicle and equipment maintenance, fundraising, translation services, preplanning assistance, and more. On a national level, Fire Corps is managed by the National Volunteer Fire Council.

Fire Corps was launched in 2004 under the national Citizen Corps initiative, the Federal Emergency Management Agency’s grassroots strategy designed to bring together government and community leaders to involve citizens in all-hazards emergency preparedness and resilience.

The Fire Corps web site serves as a gateway to information, resources, training, and networking opportunities for fire/EMS departments as well as community members interested in non-operational volunteer opportunities with their local department. Departments can post their Fire Corps program’s volunteer opportunities and community members can find a local opportunity through the Make Me A Firefighter volunteer opportunities database managed by the National Volunteer Fire Council.
