= National Volunteer Fire Council =

The National Volunteer Fire Council (NVFC) is the leading 501(c)(3) nonprofit membership association representing the interests of the volunteer fire, EMS, and rescue services. Founded in 1976, the NVFC serves as the voice of the volunteer in the national arena and provides tools, resources, programs, and advocacy for first responders across the nation.

The NVFC provides advocacy for first responders on a national level. This includes promoting legislation that benefits the fire and emergency medical services. Representatives from the NVFC also sit on many standards-setting committees as well as national fire service taskforces, workgroups, and committees. In addition, the NVFC produces tools, resources, and programs to address the needs of the volunteer fire and emergency services.

== Mission ==
The mission of the NVFC is to provide a unified voice for volunteer fire/EMS organizations. The NVFC accomplishes its mission and provides meaningful support to fire and EMS organizations through services and programs, including:

- Representing the interests of volunteer fire, EMS, and rescue organizations at the U.S. Congress, federal agencies, and national standards setting committees
- Focusing on health and safety
- Helping departments recruit and retain fire service and EMS/rescue personnel
- Promoting and providing education and training for volunteer fire/EMS organizations
- Assisting departments in establishing support programs
- Fostering the next generation of firefighters

== Leadership ==
The NVFC has 47 state fire association members, each of which appoints up to two representatives from their organization to serve on the NVFC Board of Directors. The board meets as a whole twice a year. Each state has one vote.

== Membership ==
The NVFC is the only national organization whose sole mission is to support the volunteer fire, emergency medical, and rescue services. Membership consists of 47 state fire associations as well as individual and corporate members. A full listing of membership options and benefits is available on the NVFC web site.

== EMS/Rescue Section ==
The mission of the NVFC's EMS/Rescue Section is to provide volunteers in an EMS or rescue delivery system with information, education, services, and representation to enhance their professionalism. The Section is made up of NVFC members but has its own leadership elected annually by Section members. The Section can make recommendations to the full NVFC Board of Directors, and the Section chair sits on the NVFC Executive Committee.

== Programs ==
=== Fire Corps ===
Fire Corps is a national grassroots effort to connect community members with their local fire/EMS department to perform non-operational roles. Launched in December 2004, Fire Corps increases the capacity of local fire and EMS departments by engaging the talents and skills of community volunteers in support roles such as fire safety and prevention education, administration, fundraising, public relations, or whatever the department needs. This frees up firefighters to focus on training and emergency response, as well as increases the services the department can offer.

=== Heart-Healthy Firefighter Program ===
Heart attack is the leading cause of on-duty firefighter fatalities each year. The NVFC launched the Heart-Healthy Firefighter Program in 2003 to combat this trend by providing tools, resources, and information to keep first responders healthy and better prepared for the rigors of emergency response. It also provides resources to help fire and EMS departments start a department-wide health and wellness program.

=== Make Me A Firefighter Program™ ===
Make Me A Firefighter™ is a national volunteer firefighter and EMS recruitment and retention campaign launched by the NVFC in 2015 thanks to a grant from the Federal Emergency Management Agency. The campaign features a department portal with resources and tools for implementing a local recruitment campaign as well as a public web site to allow potential volunteers to find local fire service opportunities.

=== National Junior Firefighter Program ===
The NVFC established the National Junior Firefighter Program to help fire and EMS departments foster the next generation of responders. The national program provides tools and resources to help local departments implement a youth program. The goal of the National Junior Firefighter Program is to get more youth involved in the fire and emergency services, thus fostering a lifelong connection with the emergency services where they can continue to serve as first responders or community supporters of the fire service throughout their adulthood. Junior firefighter programs also instill life-enhancing skills and values such as leadership, teamwork, responsibility, and community service in the youth who participate.

=== Serve Strong ===
The health and safety of the nation's volunteer fire and emergency service personnel are top priorities for the NVFC. Each year, emergency responders are killed or injured due to factors that may have been prevented with the proper safety and health precautions. The NVFC promotes and implements initiatives to keep first responders healthy and safe through its Serve Strong campaign, which features a variety of health and safety training and resources on topics such as preventing cancer, reducing heart attack risk, coping with behavioral health issues, and engaging in safe practices both on and off the fireground.

=== Share the Load™ ===
The NVFC's Share the Load™ program provides access to resources and information to help first responders and their families manage and overcome behavioral health challenges such as post-traumatic stress, anxiety, depression, addiction, and more. Resources are also available to help departments implement a behavioral health program for their members.

=== Wildland Fire Assessment Program ===
The Wildland Fire Assessment Program (WFAP) is a joint effort by the U.S. Forest Service and the NVFC to provide fire service volunteers with training on how to properly conduct safety assessments for homes located in the wildland–urban interface. This is the first program targeted to volunteers that specifically prepares them to evaluate a home and provide residents with recommendations to protect their homes and property from wildfires.
