= Causecast =

US software company

Causecast was a software company founded in 2007 and based in Los Angeles. The company provided an online platform that helped businesses and organizations manage community giving, employee volunteering, donations, matching, rewarding, and cause campaigns ranging from disaster relief to competitive corporate crowdfunding.

== History ==
Causecast was formed by Ryan Scott in 2007. In August 2019, it was announced that America's Charities acquired Causecast.

== Services ==
The Causecast SaaS technology offered tools to make workplace giving and volunteering more efficient and allows corporations to track volunteering and giving efforts in real-time.
