= Radelet =

Radelet is a surname. Notable people with the surname include:

- Carrie Hessler-Radelet, American nonprofit executive
- Michael L. Radelet (born 1950), American sociologist
- Patricia Radelet-de Grave (born 1948), Belgian historian of science
- Ruth Radelet (born 1982), American singer, songwriter and musician
- Steven Radelet, American economist
