= Deepak Lal =

Indian economist (1940–2020)

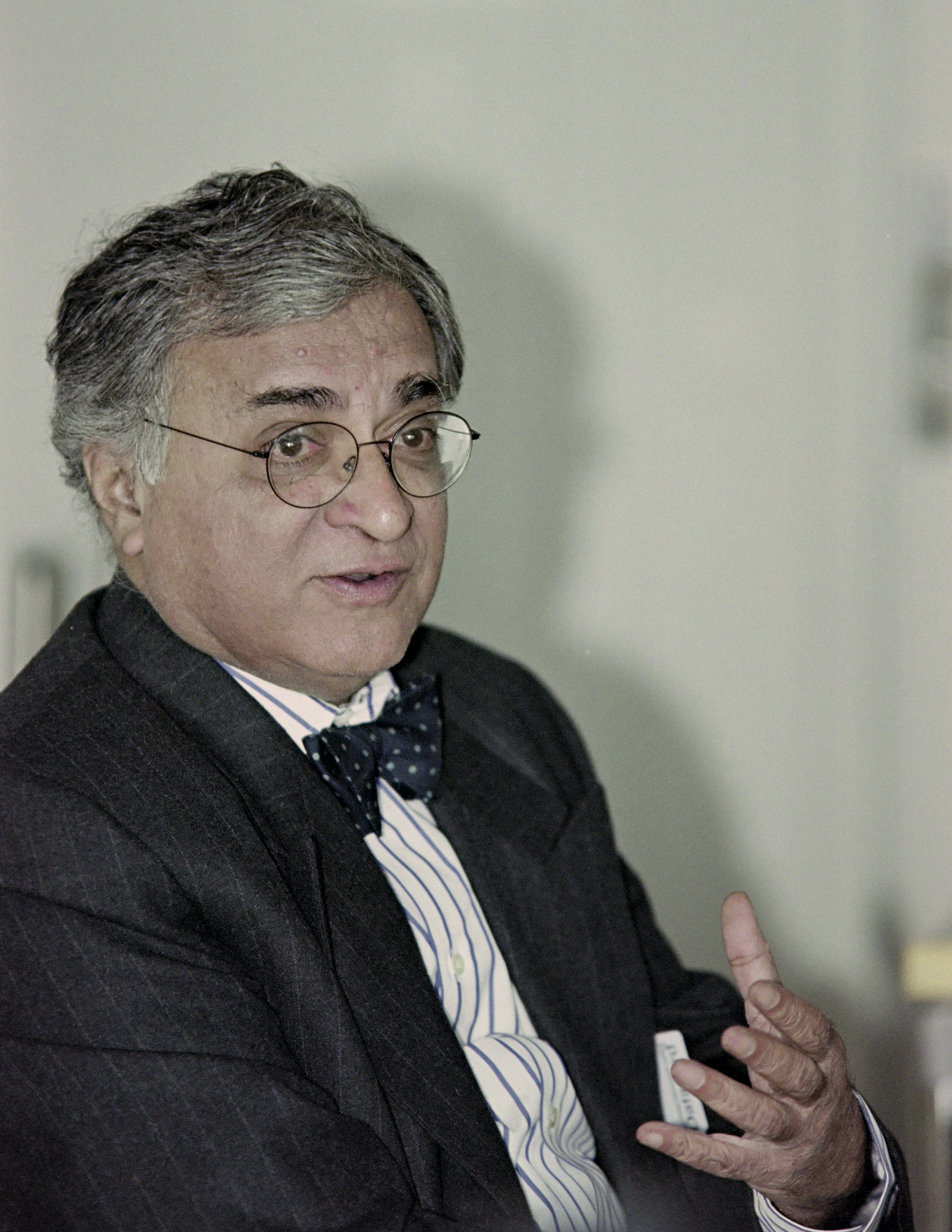
- Born: 3 January 1940; Lahore, British India
- Died: 3 March 2020 (aged 80); London, England
- Spouse: Barbara Ballis Lal (m. 1971)

Academic background
- Education: Jesus College, Oxford

Academic work
- Discipline: Economics
- Sub-discipline: Development economics
- Institutions: University of California, Los Angeles (1991-2020); University College London (1970-1993); University of Oxford (1966-1970)

Deepak Kumar Lal (1940 – 30 April 2020) was an Indian-born British liberal economist, author, professor and consultant. Best known for his 1983 book, The Poverty of “Development Economics", Lal was also known for bucking conventional assumptions and for multidisciplinary approaches to thorny economic problems. His proposed solutions were typically in the vein of Hayek or the Austrian School of economic thinking.

== Biography ==
=== Education and early career ===
He was born in Lahore, then in British India, on 3 January 1940. He attended the Doon School in Dehradun, India. He studied history at St. Stephen's College of the University of Delhi, graduating in 1959. He then studied at Jesus College, Oxford, receiving a BA in philosophy, politics, and economics in 1962, and a BPhil in economics in 1965. From 1963 to 1966, overlapping with his time at Oxford, he was a junior member of India's diplomatic corps, the Indian Foreign Service, but resigned.

=== Later career ===
In 1966, he taught at Jesus College, Oxford. The 1989 American Economic Review directory lists him as a lecturer at Christ Church, Oxford from 1966 to 1968, and as a research fellow at Nuffield College, Oxford, from 1968 to 1970. From 1970 to 1993, he taught at University College London, where he was appointed Professor of Political Economy in 1984, and Professor Emeritus of Political Economy in 1993. The 1989 American Economic Review directory listed his research interests as "North-South issues, labor markets in developing countries". In 1978, he was a visiting fellow at the Australian National University.

In 1993, he became the James S. Coleman Professor of International Development Studies at the University of California, Los Angeles, where he remained until his death in 2020. He also served as a research fellow at the UCLA Center for India and South Asia.

He was a consultant to the International Labour Organization, the United Nations Conference on Trade and Development, the United Nations Industrial Development Organization, the Indian Planning Commission, the World Bank, the Organisation for Economic Co-operation and Development, and the Planning Ministries of Sri Lanka and South Korea. He served as Economic Advisor to the World Bank from 1983 to 1984, and as a Research Administrator from 1984 to 1987.

From 1994 to 1997, he was co-director of the Trade Policy Unit at the Center for Policy Studies. From 1994 to 1998, he was chairman of the Board of Advisors of the Nestle Lecture on the developing world. From 2000 to 2009, he was a member of the UK Shadow Chancellor's Council of Economic Advisors.

From 1999 onward, he served as a distinguished visiting fellow at the National Council for Economic Research in New Delhi. He was also a research fellow at the Independent Institute and a Senior Fellow at the Cato Institute. From 2008 to 2010, he served as president of the Mont Pelerin Society.

He received honorary doctorates from the Paul Cézanne University in Aix-en-Provence, France in 2002 and the Pontifical Catholic University of Peru in Lima, Peru in 2010. In 2007, he received the Italian Societa Libera's International Freedom Prize for Economics.

Lal died in 2020 from COVID-19.

== Bibliography ==
- Wells and Welfare: An Exploratory Cost-Benefit Study of Small-Scale Irrigation in Maharashtra (1972)
- New Economic Policies for India (1973)
- Methods of Project Analysis: A Review (1974)
- Appraising Foreign Investment in Developing Countries (1975)
- Men or Machines: A Study of Labor-Capital Substitution in Road Construction in the Philippines (1978)
- Poverty, Power and Prejudice: The North-South Confrontation (1978)
- Market Access for Semi-Manufacturers from Developing Countries (1979)
- Prices for Planning: Towards the Reform of Indian Planning (1980)
- A Liberal International Economic Order: The International Monetary System and Economic Development (1980)
- Labor and Poverty in Kenya, 1800–1980 (with P. Collier, 1986)
- Stagflation, Savings and the State: Perspective on the Global Economy (ed., with M. Wolf, 1986)
- Economic Growth in India (1988)
- Impediments to Trade Liberalization in Sri Lanka (with S. Rajapatirana, 1989)
- The Hindu Equilibrium: Vol. I – India – Cultural Stability and Economic Stagnation, C. 1500 B.C. (1989)
- The Hindu Equilibrium: Vol. II – Aspects of Indian Labor (1989)
- Nationalized Universities: Paradox of the Privatization (1989)
- Public Policy and Economic Development: Essays in Honor of I.M.D. Little (1990)
- The Limits of International Cooperation (1990)
- Political Economy and Public Policy (1990)
- Fighting Fiscal Privilege (ed., 1992)
- The Repressed Economy: Causes, Consequences, Reform (1993)
- Against Dirigisme: The Case for Unshackling Economic Markets (1994)
- The Minimum Wage (1995)
- Poverty Markets and Democracy (1995)
- The Political Economy of Poverty, Equity and Growth: A Comparative Study (with H. Myint, 1996)
- Unintended Consequences: The impact of Factor Endowments, Culture and Politics On Long Run Economic Performance (1998)
- Unfinished Business: India in the World Economy (1999)
- Renewing the Miracle: Economic Development and Asia (1999)
- EMU and Globalization (1999)
- Culture, Democracy and Development (1999)
- Green Imperialism: A Prescription for Misery and War in the World's Poorest Countries (1999)
- Smoke Gets in Your Eyes (2000)
- The New Cultural Imperialism: Green scares and economic development (2000)
- The Poverty of "Development Economics" (2000)
- Trade, Development and Political Economy: Essays in honour of Anne Krueger (eds., with R. Snape, 2001)
- A Premium on Health: A national health insurance scheme (2001)
- The Japanese Slump (2001)
- In Defense of Empires (2004)
- In Praise of Empires: Globalization and Order (2004)
- The Hindu Equilibrium: India c. 1500 B.C.–2000 A.D. (2004)
- Reviving the Invisible Hand: The Case for Classical Liberalism in the Twenty-first Century (2006)
- Lost Causes: The Retreat from Classical Liberalism (2012)
- War or Peace: The Struggle for Power (2018)
