= John R. Harris =

American economist (1934–2018)

John Rees Harris (February 7, 1934 – July 7, 2018), professor of economics at Boston University, was an American economist known for his work in the field of development economics. Harris earned a PhD in economics from Northwestern University in 1967. Harris was an African Development economist. His work on labor markets and wages, embodied in the Harris-Todaro Model is a foundation of contemporary Development Economics, and was constructed based on observations of Nigerian and Kenyan labor markets. Harris directly worked for numerous governmental and non-governmental agencies including USAID, World Bank, International Labor Organization, the WHO, the Canadian International Development Research Center the Ford Foundation, the Rockefeller Foundation, the UN Economic Commission for Africa and the UN Development Programme. Harris was a member of the advisory group of the Macroeconomic Research Network for Eastern and Southern Africa, the precursor to the African Economic Research Consortium (AERC).

== Select positions ==
- Senior fellow, Boston Institute for Developing Economies (BIDE), 1989–present
- Employment advisor, Government of Indonesia, 1989
- Professor of economics, Boston University, 1975–present
- Director, African Studies Center, Boston University, 1975–88;
- Associate professor of economics and associate director, Special Program in Regional and Urban Studies of Developing Areas, Massachusetts Institute of Technology, 1970–75;
- Visiting research fellow, Institute for Development Studies, University College, Nairobi, 1968–69;
- Associate research fellow, Nigerian Institute of Social and Economic Research, 1965.

== Innovations ==
In the field of economic development Harris is the author of over 36 publications in peer-reviewed academic journals. Most famously Harris coauthored the Harris Todaro Model along with Michael Todaro which addressed significant shortcomings in existing development theory and built upon the two-sector framework made famous by Sir Arthur Lewis. The paper in which the model is presented was published in the American Economic Review in 1970 and has been identified as one of the 20 most influential economic papers of all time by Business Insider and one of the top 20 of the past 100 years by the American Economic Association.
