= Lewis model =

Lewis model may refer to:

- William Arthur Lewis's model of economic development i.e. the dual-sector model
- Richard D. Lewis's Lewis Model of Cross-Cultural Communication
- Lewis acids and bases, a model proposed by Gilbert N. Lewis
- John Lewis Partnership, a British public limited company owned by a trust on behalf of its employees
