= Todaro paradox =

Concept in economics

The Todaro paradox refers to a concept in economics where an increase in the number of urban jobs leads to an increase, rather than a decrease, in the absolute number of unemployed people. The paradox was first discussed by Michael Todaro in 1976 when he identified it as a consequence of the Harris–Todaro model.
