= Kurt Mandelbaum =

German-British economist

Kurt Mandelbaum (13 November 1904 – 28 September 1995), also known as Kurt Martin and Curt Martin, was a German-British economist known for his pioneering contribution in the field of the economics of development.

In his youth Mandelbaum was involved with leftist politics and had several years at the Frankfurt School for Social Research.

During the war worked with allied intelligence and subsequently joined the Oxford Institute of Statistics. Whilst at Oxford he undertook his study of the problems of recovery in S.E. Europe. This small book which was to become one of core texts for the new discipline, stressed

- the need to mobilize savings,
- the need for infrastructure,
- the extent of disguised rural unemployment,
- the need for calculating inter-industry calculations (anticipating the use of input-output analysis).

In 1950 he moved to Manchester and with his colleague W. Arthur Lewis helped establish the Department of Economics at the University of Manchester as a major centre in Development Economics research and teaching. After retiring from Manchester he worked for a further seventeen years at the Institute of Social Studies at The Hague.

Mandelbaum (also known as Kurt Martin and Curt Martin) was one of a group of emigre economists from Central Europe who played a large role in founding the discipline of development economics in the UK, during and shortly after World War II. In general these economists doubted the usefulness of neoclassical economics with its presumptions of smoothly operating markets and saw the role of the state as being key to the development process. The industrialization debates in the USSR in the 1920s were their starting point.
