= J K Bajaj =

Indian physicist

Dr Jatinder Kumar Bajaj (J K Bajaj) (born 21 March 1952 in Punjab, India) is the founding director of the Center for Policy Studies, Chennai. He currently serves as a Member of the Commission to Examine Sub-categorisation of Other Backward Classes set-up by the President of India under Article 340 of the Constitution of India and also as the Chairman of the Indian Council of Social Science Research. Bajaj was conferred the Padma Shri, the fourth highest national award of India, on January 26, 2022.

== Background ==
Born on March 21, 1952 at Giddarbaha in Sri Muktsar Sahib District of Punjab, Bajaj had his early education at Government High School, Giddarbaha and D.A.V. College Amritsar. He earned an M.Sc. (Honours) degree in 1973 and Ph.D. (Theoretical Physics) in 1978 from the Department of Physics, Punjab University, Chandigarh. During his research career in physics, he has worked at the Indian Institute of Technology, Kanpur and Bombay and at the Department of Theoretical Physics, University of Madras, Chennai.

== Early Career in Physics (1973-1981) ==
In his research career in Physics, Bajaj worked on extensive analysis of the phenomenology of non-leptonic decays of baryons in various conventional schemes of symmetry breaking in weak interactions and on weak mixing in grand-unified gauge theories.

== Center for Policy Studies ==
In 1990, Bajaj along with a few colleagues founded the Centre for Policy Studies at Chennai with the objective to engage seriously with Indian ideas and institutions and to comprehending India from an Indian perspective.

== Books ==
=== Center for Policy Studies ===
1. Making of a Hindu Patriot: Background of Mahatma Gandhiji’s Hind Swaraj, Centre for Policy Studies and Har-Anand Publications, 2021.
2. Hind Swaraj, authentic editions of the text based on the original handwritten Gujarati of Mahatma Gandhi, along with a verbatim Hindi translation, and the original English edition published from Phoenix along with detailed notes. Center for Policy Studies, 2012.
3. Scheduled Tribes of India: Religious Demography and Representation, 2011.
4. Religious Demography of India, A. P. Joshi, M. D. Srinivas and J. K. Bajaj, Centre for Policy Studies, Chennai, 2003.
5. Timeless India Resurgent India,A Celebration of the Land and People of India, Jitendra Bajaj and M. D. Srinivas, Centre for Policy Studies, Chennai 2001; also published in Hindi, Centre for Policy Studies, Chennai 2001.
6. Restoring Abundance: Regeneration of Indian Agriculture to Ensure Food for All in Plenty, J. K. Bajaj and M. D. Srinivas, IIAS, Shimla, 2001.
7. Food for All, ed. J. K. Bajaj, Centre for Policy Studies, Chennai 2001
8. Annam Bahu Kurvita: Recollecting the Indian Discipline of Growing and Sharing Food in Plenty, Jatinder K Bajaj and M. D. Srinivas, Centre for Policy Studies, Chennai 1996; also published in Hindi 1996, and Tamil 1998.
9. Ayodhya and the Future India, ed. Jitendra Bajaj, CPS, Chennai 1993.
10. Bharatiya Chitta Manas and Kala, by Sri Dharampal, tr. and ed. Jitendra Bajaj, Centre for Policy Studies, Chennai 1993.
11. Indian Economy and Polity, ed. J. K. Bajaj, Centre for Policy Studies (1995)
12. Land, People and History of Ullavur: A Locality that Reaps the Bounty of Palar, Jatinder K Bajaj and M. D. Srinivas, Centre for Policy Studies, Chennai 2024
13. The Land, People and History of Kundratthur: The Abode of Murugan and the Birthplace of Sekkizhar, Jatinder K Bajaj and M. D. Srinivas, Centre for Policy Studies, Chennai 2024

=== Resource Atlases of Madhya Pradesh ===
1. Resource Atlas of Madhya Pradesh (English, 2007)
2. Resource Atlas of Jhabua (English, 2008)
3. Resource Atlas of Sidhi And Singrauli (English 2010)
4. Resource Atlas of Tikamgarh, (English 2012)
5. Resource Atlas of Jhabua and Alirajpur, (Hindi 2012)
6. Resource Atlas of Datia , (English 2013)
7. Resource Atlas of Datia , (Hindi 2015)
8. Agricultural Atlas of Madhya Pradesh
9. Resource Atlas of Tikamgarh (Hindi 2015)
