= Michael Connolly =

Michael Connolly may refer to:

- Michael Connolly (Canadian politician) (born 1994), Canadian politician in Alberta
- Michael Connolly (hurler) (born 1954), Irish retired hurler
- Michael Connolly (Irish politician) (1860–1945), Irish Cumann na nGaedhael politician
- Michael Connolly (Medal of Honor) (1855–?), American sailor and Medal of Honor recipient
- Michael J. Connolly (born 1947), former politician; Massachusetts Secretary of the Commonwealth, 1979–1994
- Michael B. Connolly, development economist

== See also ==
- Mike Connolly (disambiguation)
- Michael Connelly (disambiguation)
- Michael Conneely (born 1949), Irish hurler
