= Mike Connolly =

Mike Connolly may refer to:

- Mike Connolly (columnist) (1913–1966), American gossip columnist
- Mike Connolly (ice hockey) (born 1989), Canadian ice hockey player
- Mike Connolly (Iowa politician) (born 1945), Iowa state senator
- Mike Connolly (Massachusetts politician) (born 1980), Cambridge attorney and activist

== See also ==
- Michael Connolly (disambiguation)
- Michael Connelly (disambiguation)
- Mike Conley (disambiguation)
