= The Poverty of "Development Economics" =

1983 book by Deepak Lal

- Author: Deepak Lal
- Language: English
- Publisher: Institute of Economic Affairs
- Publication date: 1983
- Publication place: United Kingdom

The Poverty of "Development Economics" is a 1983 book by Deepak Lal. Adam Szirmai notes that this book "summarised and popularised much of the earlier criticisms on the dominant paradigm" in development economics and that it "was an influential publication which contributed to the enormous shift in thinking about development." The dominant paradigm that he was criticising is described by Lal as the "dirigiste dogma". However, this has been criticised with claims that Lal overstated his case claiming that those he criticised had wanted to "supplant" rather than supplement the price and market system, but that he failed to provide evidence for this.

== The four essential elements of the "dirigiste dogma" ==
He characterizes this "dirigiste dogma" as having four essential elements:

1. markets need supplanting (not merely supplementing) by "various forms of direct government control"
2. that orthodox microeconomics concern with the allocation of given (admittedly possibly changing) resources is of minor importance when designing policy in developing economies. Rather policy should be concerned with designing and implementing a broad "strategy" of development - one whose focus is macroeconmic aggregates such as: savings, investment, the balance of payments, and the sectoral composition of production. Choosing between agriculture and industry.
3. that the arguments for free trade are not valid for developing countries - justifying restrictions on trade and international payments.
4. massive and continuing governmental intervention is required to redistribute assets and to manipulate prices in order to alleviate poverty and to improve income distribution.

For Lal the sources of this "dogma" is Keynesian macroeconomics - with its macro quantity adjustments, the growth and spread of national income accounting, the increased use of macroeconometrics (a la Tinbergen and his associates and successors), and the increased use input-output analysis (a la Leontief). While these may have helped our understanding of macroeconomics, Lal argues, but they have led to an underemphasis on the role of prices.

This overfocusing on macroeconomic aggregates, also led to an ignoring of welfare economics. This later Lal argues provides the most useful analytical framework for examining the dirigistes' arguments about the inadequacies of the free market and the scope for government interventions due to missing markets or distributional worries. Lal stresses that in the "real-world" governments' interventions have both resource and distortion costs. Thus, he argues, in a second-best world government intervention should not be undertaken lightly just because of market failures. Rather a proper comparison with other alternatives such as nonintervention should be made. When this is done in each of the four exemplar areas in which he summarizes the historical experience of dirigiste intervention and orthodox counterpositions he argues non intervention comes out on top.

== Exemplars ==
The major elements of the "dirigiste dogma", the ideas that underlie them and the claims of this "dogma" are examined in four important areas of development economics:

1. role of foreign trade and private capital flows
2. role and appropriate form of industrialization
3. the relationship between reductions in inequality, poverty alleviation and differing broad development strategies
4. the role of market prices mechanism versus planning

== Conclusions ==
Lal's conclusion is that:

- "the most serious current distortions in many developing economies are not those flowing from the inevitable imperfections of a market economy" but rather "the policy-induced . . . distortions created by irrational dirigisme" (p. 103),
- "imperfect markets are superior to imperfect planning" (p. 106) implying that "the most important advice that economists can currently offer is ... Get the prices right!" (p. 107),
- "the major conclusion of this book is that the demise of development economics is likely to be conducive to the health of both the economics and the economies of developing countries" (p. 109).

== The Book ==
Lal, Deepak (1983), The Poverty of Development Economics, Institute of Economic Affairs, London

Lal, Deepak (1985), The Poverty of "Development Economics." Cambridge, Mass.: Harvard University Press, pp. 153.

Lal, Deepak (2000), The Poverty of "Development Economics. " 2d revised and expanded U.S. edition. Cambridge: MIT Press.

== Reviews in Peer Reviewed Academic Journals ==
Asadullah, M Niaz (2002) The Poverty of "Development Economics", Latin American Politics and Society, Summer

Behrman, Jere R. (1987) The Poverty of "Development Economics" by Deepak Lal, A Book Review in The Journal of Political Economy, Vol. 95, No. 4 (Aug.), pp. 885–887

McGilvray, J. W. (1983) The poverty of ‘development economics’. Deepak Lal, Book Review, Managerial and Decision Economics Volume 6, Issue 4, Pages260 - 262

Szirmai, Adam (2002) The Poverty of "Development Economics" Book Review Economic Record, Vol. 78, 2002

Toye, John (1985) Dirigisme and development economics Cambridge Journal of Economics, 9, 1–14

== Newspaper comment ==
The Times (1983) 'Third World Theories Attacked' (Michael Prest: Monday, Aug 22, pg. 13; Issue 61617; col F)

The Times (1983) 'Third World Theories face a Counter-revolution' (Michael Prest: Friday, Sep 09, pg. 15; Issue 61633; col B)
