= Mike Conley =

Mike Conley may refer to:

- Mike Conley (boxer) (1860–1920), American boxer
- Mike Conley (triple jumper) (born 1962), American track and field athlete
- Mike Conley (basketball) (born 1987), American basketball player and son of the above
- Michael E. Conley, commander US Air Force Special Operations Command

== See also ==
- Mike Connolly (disambiguation)
