= Lewis turning point =

Situation in economic development

The Lewis turning point is a situation in economic development where surplus rural labor is fully absorbed into the manufacturing sector. This typically causes agricultural and unskilled industrial real wages to rise. The term is named after economist W. Arthur Lewis. Shortly after the Lewis point, an economy requires balanced growth policies.

Typically, reaching the Lewis turning point causes an increase in the wage bill and the functional distribution favoring labor. However, in some cases such as in Japan from 1870 to 1920, agricultural labor productivity increased significantly and produced a labor surplus, dampening the rise in real wages.

According to a study by Zhang and Yang, China reached the Lewis point in 2010; cheap labor in the country has rapidly decreased and real agricultural wages have substantially increased. Despite its large population, in the early 2010s China faced labor shortages, and real wages nearly doubled since 2003. Such rapid rise in wages for unskilled work is a key indicator of reaching the Lewis point. However, other journals such as the China Economic Review claim that China has not reached the Lewis point, comparing the effect of the Lewis point in China to the Japanese experience. A 2013 working paper by the International Monetary Fund predicts the Lewis point in China to "emerge between 2020 and 2025".

== Lewis curve and automation ==
In their book, Tshilidzi Marwala and Evan Hurwitz used Arthur Lewis' theory to understand the transition of the economy into the Fourth Industrial Revolution, where much of the production in the economy is automated by artificially intelligent machines. In this regard, they identified an equilibrium point, i.e. Lewis turning point, where automating human labor does not result in additional economic benefit.
