= Society for International Development =

The Society for International Development (SID) was founded in Washington, D.C., United States, in 1957.

SID has a network of individual and institutional members, local chapters and partner organisations, in more than 80 countries. It works with more than 100 associations, networks and institutions involving academia, parliamentarians, students, political leaders and development experts, both at local and international level.

== Secretariat ==
The SID Secretariat has been based in Rome since 1979. Additionally, SID opened a Regional Office for Eastern and Southern Africa in Nairobi in 2003.

== Governing Council ==
SID members elect the SID Governing Council via a mail ballot every four years. The current council for the 2012–2015 period is:

- President: Juma Volter Mwapachu, Society for International Development, Tanzania
- Vice President: Jean Gilson, Senior Vice President, Strategy and Information Technology at DAI
- Treasurer: René Grotenhuis, Chief Executive Officer Cordaid, The Netherlands
- Managing Director: Stefano Prato, Society for International Development

== SID Journal Development ==
Development (ISSN 1011-6370, eISSN: ISSN 1461-7072) is the quarterly journal of the Society for International Development (SID), published by the Palgrave Macmillan press.

The ISO 4 abbreviation for the journal is Development (Rome), but it is also cited as Development (Washington).

== Membership ==
Most SID members are organised into local chapters through which they have the opportunity to engage in development initiatives and events (such as conferences, seminars, lecture series, round tables, advocacy campaigns, charity events) in their locale maintaining a strong link with the territory.

== Washington Chapter ==
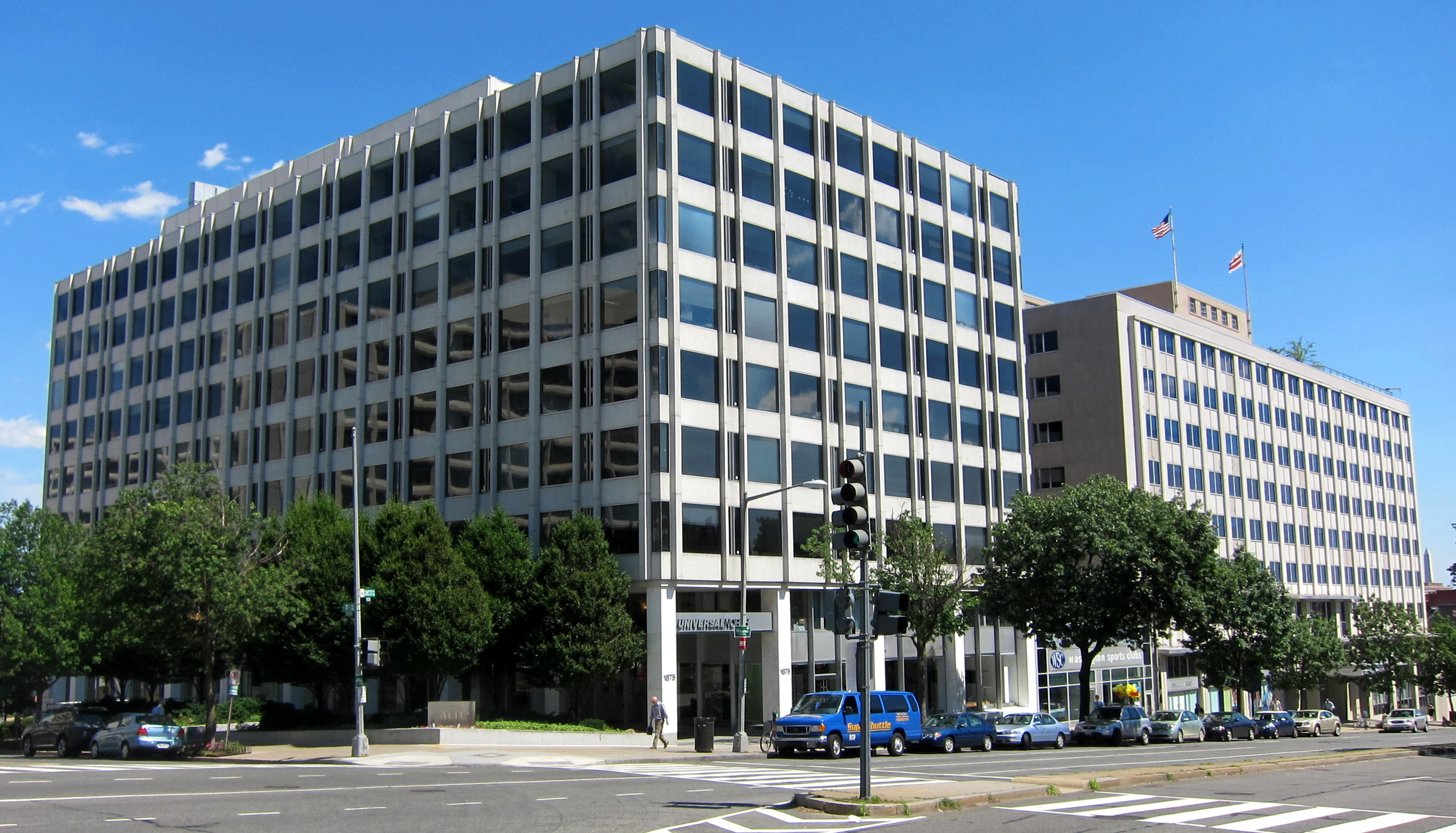
SID-Washington's previous 15th Street office in Washington, D.C. The SID-W Chapter moved to its new 19th Street office in May 2016.

The Washington Chapter is the largest and most active chapter of the Society for International Development, with 150 member organizations and over a thousand individual members.

SID-Washington is committed to three principal objectives:

- Stimulating dialogue and cooperation on global development issues
- Enhancing skills, knowledge and understanding among development practitioners
- Providing a network for individuals and organizations working in various sectors of international development

=== Notable event speakers ===
- J. Brian Atwood, former Administrator of USAID and Dean of the Hubert H. Humphrey Institute of Public Affairs
- Paul Collier, CBE, Director of the Centre for the Study of African Economies and author of The Bottom Billion: Why the Poorest Countries are Failing and What Can Be Done about It
- Amb. John J. Danilovich, Chief Executive Officer, Millennium Challenge Corporation
- Dr. Kemal Derviş, former Administrator of the UNDP and currently Director of the Global Economy and Development Program at the Brookings Institution
- Dr. William Easterly, author of The White Man's Burden: Why the West's Efforts to Aid the Rest Have Done So Much Ill and So Little Good
- Michael Fairbanks, Co-Founder of SEVEN and co-author of Plowing the Sea, Nurturing the Hidden Sources of Advantage in Developing Nations
- Richard Feachem, KBE, FREng, Director of the Global Health Group
- Henrietta H. Fore, former Under-Secretary of State and former Acting Administrator of USAID
- Dr. Francis Fukuyama, Director of the International Development Program at the Paul H. Nitze School of Advanced International Studies and author of The End of History and the Last Man
- Amb. Zalmay Khalilzad, former United States Ambassador to the United Nations
- Former U.S. Representative Jim Kolbe, former Chairman of the House Appropriations Subcommittee on Foreign Operations
- Dr. Carol Lancaster, Interim Dean of the Edmund A. Walsh School of Foreign Service and former Counsel to the President's Foreign Intelligence Advisory Board
- U.S. Representative Nita Lowey, Chair, House Appropriations Subcommittee on Foreign Operations
- Ad Melkert, Under-Secretary General of the UN and Associate Administrator of UNDP
- Andrew Natsios, former USAID Administrator and President's Special Envoy for Sudan
- Amb. John D. Negroponte, former Director of National Intelligence and former Deputy Secretary of State
- U.S. Representative David Obey, Chairman, House Appropriations Committee
- Ngozi Okonjo-Iweala former Finance Minister and former Foreign Minister of Nigeria
- Anne-Marie Slaughter, Director of Policy Planning at the U.S. Department of State
- Aaron S. Williams, Director of the Peace Corps

== Buenos Aires Chapter ==
The Buenos Aires Chapter (SID-Baires) was created at the end of 1957, by a group of Argentinean intellectuals and scholars. The chapter – known as "Argentine Chapter" changed the name to "Buenos Aires Chapter" in 2000, following the creation of two new chapters in the cities of Rosario and La Plata. The Buenos Aires Chapter is one of the oldest chapter of SID that has engaged consistently and continuously for more than 50 years in activities and programmers addressing development questions and processes from a both national and international perspective.

In September 2010, the first issue of SIDbaires' new magazine, Qué? Hacer para el Desarrollo, was launched.

== Netherlands Chapter ==
The Society for International Development in the Netherlands (SID NL) was founded in 1991.

=== Activities ===
SID NL organises lectures, debates and conferences on international cooperation development. Each activity provides the audience with the opportunity to enter into a debate with influential (international) speaker(s).

==== SID Lectures ====
Series of lectures discussing a specific subject from multiple perspectives. The lectures take place at the VU University Amsterdam. Each series of lectures has a common theme:

- 2004–2005: Security and Development
- 2005–2006: Religion, Development and International Relations
- 2006–2007: Democracy and Development
- 2007–2008: Emerging Global Scarcities and Power Shifts
- 2008–2009: Economic Growth and the Common Good
- 2009–2010: Common Goods in a Divided World
- 2010–2011: Global Values in a Changing World
- 2011–2012: The State in a Globalizing World
- 2012–2013: The Private Sector and Development
- 2013–2014: Dispersed Power in a World in Transition
- 2014–2015: New spaces for international engagement in a globalised world

==== Notable event speakers ====
- Dr. Ben Bot, Former Minister of Foreign Affairs of the Netherlands
- Dr. Denis Broun, Executive Director of UNITAID
- Dr. J. Brian Atwood, Former Chair of the OECD Development Assistance Committee
- Mr. Bert Koenders, Former Minister for Development Cooperation of the Netherlands and current Special Representative and Head of the United Nations Multidimensional Integrated Stabilization Mission in Mali (MINUSMA).
- Prof. Dr. Thomas Pogge, author of ‘World Poverty and Human Rights’
- Mrs. Agnes van Ardenne, Former Minister for Development Cooperation of the Netherlands
- Prof. Paul Collier, Director for the Centre for the Study of African Economies at the University of Oxford
- Dr. Jan Pronk, Former Minister for Development Cooperation of the Netherlands and former Special Representative and Head of Mission for the United Nations Mission in Sudan
- Dr. Inge Kaul, Adjunct professor at the Hertie School of Governance
- Prof. Dr. He Wenping, Director of African Studies section, Institute of West-Asian & African Studies, Chinese Academy of Social Sciences
- Mr. Anwar Ibrahim, Former Deputy Prime Minister and former Finance Minister of Malaysia
- Mr. Ad Melkert, Former Minister of Social Affairs and Employment of the Netherlands and former Special Representative of the Secretary-General of the United Nations in Iraq
- Mrs. Manuela Monteiro, Former Director of Hivos
- Judge Song Sang-Hyun, President of the International Criminal Court in the Hague
- Dr. Jan-Peter Balkenende, Former Prime-Minister of the Netherlands
- Dr. Benjamin Barber, Author of "Why Mayors Should Rule the World"
- Ms. Lilianne Ploumen, Minister for Foreign Trade and Development Cooperation of the Netherlands

==== Other activities ====
- The organisation of ad hoc debates and panel discussions on topical issues
- The organisation of expert meetings, where invitees debate a particular issue. Expert meetings have taken place on topics such as global citizenship, migration and performance based aid
- The organisation of network events
- The publication of reports
