= Carrie Hessler-Radelet =

19th Director of the Peace Corps

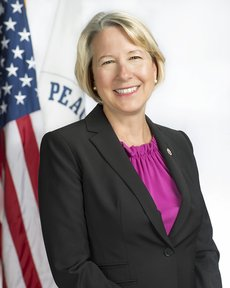

19th Director of the Peace Corps
- In office June 5, 2014 – January 20, 2017; Acting: August 21, 2012 – June 5, 2014
- President: Barack Obama
- Preceded by: Aaron S. Williams
- Succeeded by: Jody Olsen

Personal details
- Born: Atlanta, Georgia
- Party: Democratic
- Spouse: Steven Radelet
- Children: 2
- Education: Boston University; Harvard School of Public Health
- Profession: Public health

Carolyn "Carrie" Hessler-Radelet is the President & CEO of Global Communities. In 2017, she served as the President & CEO of Project Concern International (PCI)], a San Diego–based international development and humanitarian assistance organization, and led the merger of the organization with the Silver Spring, Maryland–based Global Communities in 2020. Prior to leading PCI, Hessler-Radelet was the 19th director of the Peace Corps, from 2014 to 2017. She was the Deputy Director and Chief Operating Officer of the Peace Corps from April 2010 to December 2015, serving as Acting Peace Corps Director from September 2012 until June 2014 when she was elevated to Director. She resigned on January 20, 2017, to join Project Concern International (PCI) as its President & CEO.

== Education ==
Hessler-Radelet received a B.A. in political science and economics from Boston University in 1979. She earned a Master of Science in health policy and management, with a concentration in international health and marketing, from Harvard School of Public Health in 1990.

== Career ==
Hessler-Radelet began her career as a Peace Corps Volunteer secondary school teacher in Apia, Western Samoa, from 1981 to 1984. There she helped to design a national public awareness campaign on disaster preparedness. Upon her return the U.S., she was the public affairs manager at the Peace Corps Regional Office in Boston from 1984 to 1986.

From 1986 to 1988, she founded and served as the executive director of the Special Olympics in the Republic of The Gambia, planning, developing and managing that country's first national Special Olympics games. She also served as a consultant with The Gambia Family Planning Association.

From 1989 to 1991, Hessler-Radelet served as the acting director of the Boston International Group with John Snow, Inc. She served as a technical advisor for the MotherCare Project for John Snow, Inc. in Indonesia from 1991 to 1994 and as an HIV/AIDS advisor with the Health and Child Survival Fellows Program at the USAID in Indonesia from 1994 to 1995. She was the director of the JSI/Boston International Group, for John Snow, Inc. in Boston from 1996 to 2000. From 2000 to 2010 she was the vice president and director of John Snow, Inc. (for-profit) and JSI Research and Training Institute, Inc. (non-profit) in the Washington, D.C., area.

=== Deputy director of the Peace Corps ===
On November 9, 2009, President Barack Obama nominated Hessler-Radelet to serve as the deputy director of the Peace Corps. She was appointed on June 23, 2010.

At the time of her nomination she was the director at the JSI Research and Training Institute, Inc, a global public health organization, where she oversaw the management of programs in more than 30 countries. Hessler-Radelet was a board member of the National Peace Corps Association and served on the steering committee for the US Coalition for Child Survival. During her time as deputy director, she led the roll-out of the Focus In/Train Up initiative, which provides targeted technical training to volunteers to increase their capacity-building abilities.

=== Director of the Peace Corps ===
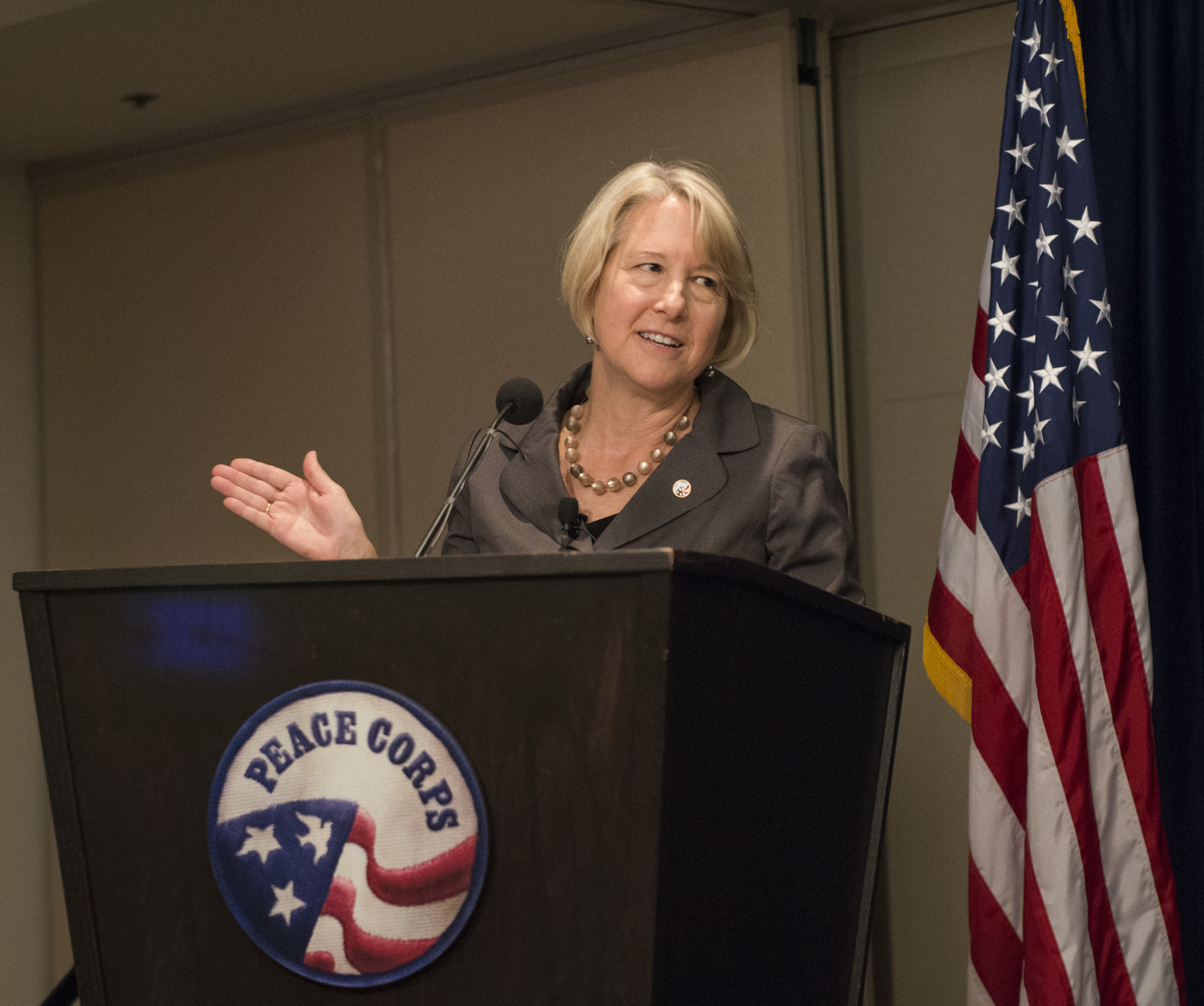
Hessler-Radelet speaks at her swearing-in ceremony in 2014

On July 18, 2013, President Barack Obama announced his intent to nominate Hessler-Radelet as the director of the Peace Corps. She was confirmed as director on June 5, 2014. As Peace Corps director, Hessler-Radelet and her administration focused on volunteer health and safety protocols, including the expansion of sexual assault risk reduction and response programs, as well as institutional recruitment strategies.

=== Service in presidential delegations ===
Hessler-Radelet led or joined two presidential delegations. On January 13, 2012, President Barack Obama announced the delegation to attend the inauguration of Ellen Johnson Sirleaf of Liberia. On January 16, 2012, Hessler-Radelet, then Peace Corps deputy director, traveled to Monrovia as part of a presidential delegation led by then Secretary of State Hillary Clinton and also including then United States Ambassador to Liberia Linda Thomas-Greenfield and United States Senator Christopher Coons, of Delaware, among others. On February 20, 2013, President Barack Obama announced the delegation to attend the inauguration of Ernest Bai Koroma of Sierra Leone. Hessler-Radelet led the delegation.

=== President and CEO of Project Concern International and Global Communities ===
In February 2017, Hessler-Radelet was named President and CEO of Project Concern International, a San Diego-based international development organization, by the board of directors. In 2019, Project Concern International merged with Global Communities, and in October 2022 Hessler-Radelet was named the president and CEO of Global Communities.

== Honors and awards ==
Hessler-Radelet has received honorary degrees from Austin College (2013), University of Puget Sound (2015), Boston University (2016), Michigan Technological University (2016), Virginia Wesleyan University (2016), and Williams College (2016). She received the Society for International Development, Award for Outstanding Leadership in International Development in November 2016.

== Personal life ==
Hessler-Radelet and her husband, international development economist Steven Radelet, served together as a couple in the Peace Corps and have two grown children.

Government offices
Preceded by Aaron S. Williams	Director of the Peace Corps; 2014–2017	Succeeded by Jody Olsen
