= Michael Todaro =

American economist (born 1942)

Michael Paul Todaro (born May 14, 1942) is an American economist and a pioneer in the field of development economics.

Todaro earned a PhD in economics from Yale University in 1968 for a thesis titled The Urban Employment Problem in Less Developed Countries – An Analysis of Demand and Supply. Todaro was Professor of Economics at New York University for eighteen years and Senior Associate at the Population Council for thirty years. He lived and taught in Africa for six years. He appears in Who's Who in Economics and Economists of the Twentieth Century. He is also the author of eight books and more than fifty professional articles. In a special February 2011 centenary edition, the American Economic Review selected Todaro's article "Migration, Unemployment and Development: A 2-Sector Analysis" (with John Harris) as one of the twenty most important articles published by that journal during the first one hundred years of its existence. He is the co-author of the widely used textbook, Economic Development, 12th Edition, published in 2014.

== Positions ==
- Membership Roster, Council on Foreign Relations. 1995
- Director, Rockefeller Foundation
- Professor of economics, New York University
- Senior Associate, at Population Council

== Innovations ==
Economic Development

Todaro is co-author of Economic Development, the leading text in that field. It begins with Principles and Concepts, offering comprehensive treatments of institutions, comparative development, and traditional and new theories of development. It examines in-depth Development Policymaking and Roles of Market, State, and Civil Society. The text examines the key topics of Poverty and Inequality, Population Growth Causes and Consequences, Urbanization and Rural-Urban Migration; Education and Health in Development; Agricultural Transformation and Rural Development; Environment and Development; International Trade and Development Strategy; Balance of Payments, Debt, Financial Crises, and Stabilization Policies; Foreign Finance, Investment, and Aid; and Finance and Fiscal Policy for Development.

Todaro's five years of living and teaching in Africa as well as two decades of extensive travel throughout Latin America and Asia, first as a director of the Rockefeller Foundation and then as a professor of economics at New York University helped shape and refine a book that is unique among development texts in approach, organization, and pedagogy. The textbook Economic Development takes a policy-oriented approach, presenting economic theory in the context of critical policy debates and country-specific case studies to show how theory relates to the problems and prospects of developing countries. Among its most significant innovations are the following:

- It teaches economic development within the context of a major set of problems, such as poverty, inequality, unemployment, population growth, environmental decay, and rural stagnation. Formal, abstract models and concepts are used to elucidate real-world development problems rather than being presented in isolation from case study illustrations.
- It adopts a problem- and policy-oriented approach to the teaching of development economics on the assumption that a central objective of any development economics course should be the fostering of a student's ability to understand contemporary economic problems of developing countries and to reach independent and informed judgments and policy conclusions about their possible resolution.
- It approaches development problems systematically by following a standard pedagogic procedure with regard to their analysis and exposition. Each chapter begins by stating the general nature of a problem, its principal issues, and how it is manifested empirically in various developing countries. The chapter then presents main goals and possible objectives, the role of economic analysis in illuminating the problem, and some possible policy alternatives and their likely consequences. This approach not only helps students think systematically about major current development issues but, even more important, provides them with a methodology and an operating procedure for analyzing and reaching policy conclusions about other contemporary and future development problems.
- It starts from the premise that it is possible to design and structure a broadly based development economics textbook that simultaneously uses the best available data from Africa, Asia, and Latin America and appropriate theoretical tools to illuminate common developing country problems, although these problems will of course differ in both scope and magnitude when we deal with such diverse countries as India, Bangladesh, Kenya, Egypt, Nigeria, Brazil, Mexico, and Guatemala.
- It focuses on a wide range of developing countries not only as independent nation-states but also in relation to one another and in their interactions with rich nations in a global economy.
- It recognizes the necessity of treating the problems of development and underdevelopment from an institutional and structural (noneconomic) as well as an economic perspective, with appropriate modifications of received general economic principles, theories, and policies. It thus attempts to combine relevant theory with realistic institutional analyses.
- It views development and underdevelopment in both domestic and international contexts, stressing the increasing interdependence of the world economy in areas such as food, energy, natural resources, technology, information, and financial flows.
- It considers the many economic, social, and institutional problems of underdevelopment as closely interrelated and requiring simultaneous and coordinated approaches to their solution at both the national and international levels.
- Topics include the capability approach to development, comparative development, economic growth, convergence, contemporary models including multiple equilibria, poverty, inequality, population, migration, urbanization, education, child labor, health, agriculture, environment, roles of markets and government, nongovernmental organisations, international trade and development, debt, conflict, aid, direct foreign investment, microfinance, public administration and fiscal and monetary policy for development.
- In the 2011 edition Todaro and Smith introduced a major section on causes and consequences of violent conflict, post-conflict recovery and development, and prevention of conflict through an improved understanding of its major causes. There is a detailed examination of impacts and outlooks regarding the 2008 financial crisis and economic development. The revision features reports of development economics empirical findings in boxes that examine a variety of both methods and topics and address both specific policy concerns — such as improving child health, education, and microfinance design — and a broader understanding of sources of disparities in the world's economies that can inform strategy of economic development. The text features comparative case studies including in-depth comparisons of Ghana and Côte d'Ivoire, and of Haiti and the Dominican Republic. It examines the United Nations Development Programme's Multidimensional Poverty Index (that was released in August 2010) and its New Human Development Index (that was released in November 2010). The 12th Edition of Economic Development was published in May 2014.

Migration research. Todaro developed the Todaro Migration Model, studied the Todaro Paradox (examining how an urban public sector job creation program could actually lead to an increased number of workers who are unemployed), coauthored the Harris Todaro Model.

== Books ==
- Internal Migration in Developing Countries: A Review of Theory, Evidence, Methodology and Research Priorities (International Labour Office, 1976)
- Economics for a Developing World: An Introduction to Principles, Problems and Policies for Development (longman, 1977)
- Economic Development in the Third World (longman, 1985)
- Economic Development, 11th ed., with Stephen C. Smith (Pearson Education and Addison-Wesley, 2011). Table of contents for 10th Ed. link from Amazon.com.
- Economics for a developing world : an introduction to principles, problems (longman, 1983)
- City bias and rural neglect : the dilemma of urban development (Population Council, 1981)
- The Struggle for Economic Development: Readings in Problems and Policies (longman, 1983)
- Development planning: Models and Methods (longman, 1983)
- Michael P. Todaro (1995). Reflections on economic development: the selected essays of Michael P. Todaro. Edward Elgar. ISBN 978-1-85898-073-7.
