= Donald Ray Snodgrass =

American author

Donald Ray Snodgrass (born December 20, 1935) is an American author.

Snodgrass was born in Akron, Ohio. He is the son of Clare Berkeley and Louise (Scala) Snodgrass. He received a Ph.D. in 1962 from Oxford University.

== Works ==
- Ceylon: An Export Economy in Transition, Irwin, 1966.
- (With Noel McGinn, Yong Bong Kim, and others) Education and Development in Korea, Council on East Asian Studies, Harvard University, 1980.
- Inequality and Economic Development in Malaysia, Oxford University Press, 1980.
- (With Malcolm Gillis, Dwight Perkins, and Michael Roemer) Economics of Development, Norton, 1984.
- (With Tyler Briggs) Industrialization and the Small Firm: Patterns and Policies, ICS Press (San Francisco, CA), 1996.

=== Contributor ===
- Gustav Ramis, editor, Government and Economic Development, Yale University Press, 1971.
- David Lim, editor, Readings on Malaysian Economic Development, Oxford University Press, 1975.
- H.L. Wilcke, editor, Improving the Nutrient Quality of Cereals, Agency for International Development, 1976.
- James E. Austin, editor, Global Malnutrition and Cereal Fortification, Ballinger, 1979.
- Russell G. Davis, editor, Planning Education for Development, Volume I, Center for Studies in Education and Development, Harvard University, 1980.
- Edward S. Mason and other editors, The Economic and Social Modernization of the Republic of Korea, Council on East Asian Studies, Harvard University, 1980.
