= Michael B. Connolly =

American academic

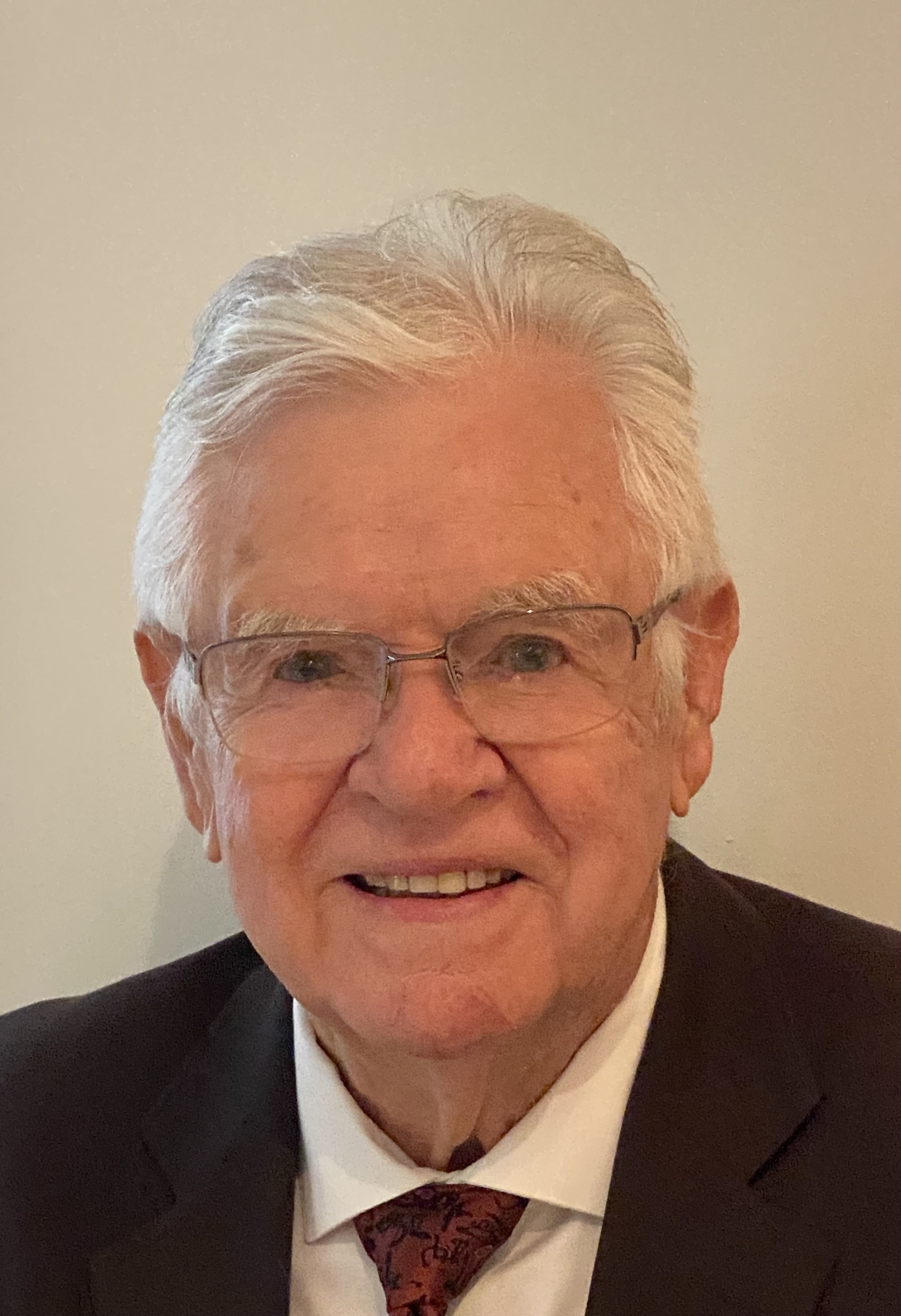
- Occupations: Development economist and university professor

Academic background
- Education: BA., Economics, University of California, Phi Beta Kappa (1964); PhD., Economics, University of Chicago (1969); Honorary PhD., Norbert Wiener University, Lima, Peru (1999)

Academic work
- Institutions: Miami Herbert Business School, University of Miami

Michael B. Connolly is a development economist and a university professor. He is a professor of economics at the Miami Herbert Business School, University of Miami, most known for his contributions to economic development, international finance and trade. His research focuses on the effects of currency boards and dollarization on risk premia in emerging markets.

Connolly has taught at several US universities, including Columbia, Duke, and Harvard, and notably instructed in Spanish at ITAM in Mexico City, in French at Université de Paris-Dauphine, and in English at Hunan University in Changsha, PRC.

Among Connolly's authored works are peer-reviewed journal articles, monographs, and books, including International Trade and Money, International Business Finance, and International Financial Management, the last of which has bilingual editions by Peking University Press. He served as Editor-in-Chief of the Journal of Economic Policy Reform from October 2001 to January 2012.

== Early life and education ==
Connolly earned a bachelor's degree in economics from UC Berkeley in 1964 and a Ph.D. in economics from the University of Chicago in 1969, studying under Milton Friedman, Robert Fogel, and Robert Mundell as thesis supervisor. He was awarded an Honorary Ph.D. in 1999 from the Universidad Norbert Weiner in Lima, Peru.

== Career ==
Connolly served as an assistant professor at SAIS-Bologna (Johns Hopkins) from 1967 to 1968 and at Harvard University from 1968 to 1972. He then became an Associate Professor and later a professor at the University of Florida from 1972 to 1978, before moving to the University of South Carolina, where he was a Professor from 1978 to 1987. He held visiting professor positions at Columbia University from 1993 to 1994 and was the acting director of the Program in Economic Policy Management there from 1994 to 1995. From 2004 to 2007, he was the Chief Scientist for Project 985 at Hunan University, Changsha, PRC and continued as a visiting professor of Finance there from 2007 to 2020 and at Hubei University of Economics in Wuhan from 2014 to 2019. In spring 2015, he held an appointment as a visiting professor at Duke University.

From 1985 to 1996, he also advised the World Bank on trade, debt and finance on missions to Argentina, Cameroon, Ecuador, Jamaica, Mongolia, Peru, Paraguay, Uzbekistan, and Uruguay.

== Research ==
Connolly's body of research comprises journal articles and books. He wrote World Bank reports on trade liberalization, financial reform, and macroeconomic issues in countries like Uzbekistan, Kenya, and Argentina from 1985 to 1996. In his early research, he used the Girton-Roper model to analyze exchange market pressure in postwar Brazil and later classified fixed exchange rate regimes in 94 countries, examining their impact on monetary policy and crawling pegs with Latin American examples. With Dean Taylor, he modelled the exact timing of a speculative attack against a fixed exchange rate regime when domestic credit grows faster than the demand for money.

== Works ==
In 1985, Connolly authored International Trade and Lending, a study of international trade and foreign lending, analyzing the Theory of Comparative Advantage, the Heckscher-Ohlin model, and issues such as trade gains and protectionism. In 2006, he also wrote International Business Finance, providing an introduction to the fundamentals of international business and finance, emphasizing the connections between foreign exchange and global money markets.

Connolly authored International Financial Management by Peking University Press with the first edition published in June 2006, the second in 2012, and the third in 2020, each featuring English text with annotated Chinese in the margins.

== Bibliography ==
=== Selected books ===
- International Trade and Money (1973) ISBN 9781138487048
- The International Monetary System: Choices for the Future (1982) ISBN 9780030617942
- International trade and lending (1985) ISBN 9780030711664
- Economic Reform and Stabilization in Latin America (1987) ISBN 9780275923075
- Latin American Debt and Adjustment: External Shocks and Macroeconomic Policies (1989) ISBN 9780275931230
- International Business Finance (2006) ISBN 9780415701532
- International Financial Management, 3rd edition, (2020) ISBN 9787301308943

=== Selected articles ===
- Connolly, M. (1970). Public Goods, Externalities, and International Relations,” Journal of Political Economy, 86(1), 279-90.
- Connolly, M. and Ross, S. (1970). A Fisherian Approach to Trade, Capital Movements and Tariffs,” American Economic Review, 60(3), 474-478.
- Connolly, M. (1972). Trade in Public Goods: A Diagrammatical Analysis, Quarterly Journal of Economics, 78(2), 61-78.
- Connolly, M., & Taylor, D. (1976). Testing the monetary approach to devaluation in developing countries. Journal of Political Economy, 84(4, Part 1), 849–859.
- Connolly, M., & Da Silveira, J. D. (1979). Exchange market pressure in postwar Brazil: An application of the Girton-Roper monetary model. The American Economic Review, 69(3), 448–454.
- Connolly, M. B., & Taylor, D. (1984). The exact timing of the collapse of an exchange rate regime and its impact on the relative price of traded goods. Journal of Money, Credit and Banking, 16(2), 194–207.
- Connolly, M. (2003). The end of the MBA as we know it?. Academy of Management Learning & Education, 2(4), 365–367.
