= Michael Connelly (disambiguation) =

Michael Connelly (born 1956) is an American author.

Michael Connelly may also refer to:

- F. Michael Connelly (born 1936), Canadian academic
- Michael Connelly (Illinois politician), American politician
- Michael Connelly (Medal of Honor) (1843–1881), American Civil War sailor and Medal of Honor recipient
- Michael Connelly (New Zealand politician) (1887–1970), politician and trade unionist
- Mick Connelly (1916–2003), New Zealand politician
- Mike Connelly (1935–2021), American football player

== See also ==
- Michael Conneely (born 1949), Irish hurler
- Michael Connolly (disambiguation)
