= Dual-sector model =

Model in developmental economics

The Dual Sector model, or the Lewis model, is a model in developmental economics that explains the growth of a developing economy in terms of a labour transition between two sectors, the subsistence or traditional agricultural sector and the capitalist or modern industrial sector.

== History ==
Initially enumerated in an article entitled "Economic Development with Unlimited Supplies of Labor" written in 1954 by Sir Arthur Lewis, the model itself was named in Lewis's honor. First published in The Manchester School in May 1954, the article and the subsequent model were instrumental in laying the foundation for the field of Developmental economics. The article itself has been characterized by some as the most influential contribution to the establishment of the discipline.

== Theory ==
The "Dual Sector Model" is a theory of development in which surplus labor from traditional agricultural sector is transferred to the modern industrial sector whose growth over time absorbs the surplus labor, promotes industrialization and stimulates sustained development.

In the model, the traditional agricultural sector is typically characterized by low wages, an abundance of labour, and low productivity through a labour intensive production process. In contrast, the modern manufacturing sector is defined by higher wage rates than the agricultural sector, higher marginal productivity, and a demand for more workers initially. Also, the manufacturing sector is assumed to use a production process that is capital intensive, so investment and capital formation in the manufacturing sector are possible over time as capitalists' profits are reinvested in the capital stock. Improvement in the marginal productivity of labour in the agricultural sector is assumed to be a low priority as the hypothetical developing nation's investment is going towards the physical capital stock in the manufacturing sector.

Since the agricultural sector has a limited amount of land to cultivate, the marginal product of an additional farmer is assumed to be zero as the law of diminishing marginal returns has run its course due to the fixed input, land. As a result, the agricultural sector has a quantity of farm workers that are not contributing to agricultural output since their marginal productivities are zero. This group of farmers that is not producing any output is termed surplus labour since this cohort could be moved to another sector with no effect on agricultural output. (The term surplus labour here is not being used in a Marxist sense and only refers to the unproductive workers in the agricultural sector.) Real wages are paid according to: $\frac{TP_{A}}{L_{A}} = W_{A}$

where $TP_{A}$ is total product in the agricultural industry, $L_{A}$ is the quantity of labor in the agricultural industry and $W_{A}$ is real wage in the agricultural industry. Therefore, due to the wage differential between the agricultural and manufacturing sectors, workers will tend to transition from the agricultural to the manufacturing sector over time to reap the reward of higher wages.

If a quantity of workers moves from the agricultural to the manufacturing sector equal to the quantity of surplus labour in the agricultural sector, regardless of who actually transfers, general welfare and productivity will improve. Total agricultural product will remain unchanged while total industrial product increases due to the addition of labour, but the additional labour also drives down marginal productivity and wages in the manufacturing sector. Over time as this transition continues to take place and investment results in increases in the capital stock, the marginal productivity of workers in the manufacturing will be driven up by capital formation and driven down by additional workers entering the manufacturing sector. Eventually, the wage rates of the agricultural and manufacturing sectors will equalise as workers leave the agriculture sector for the manufacturing sector, increasing marginal productivity and wages in agriculture whilst driving down productivity and wages in manufacturing.

The end result of this transition process is that the agricultural wage equals the manufacturing wage, the agricultural marginal product of labour equals the manufacturing marginal product of labour, and no further manufacturing sector enlargement takes place as workers no longer have a monetary incentive to transition.

=== Turning point ===
The Lewisian "turning point" is the point where the surplus labour pool is depleted. The economy then begins to resemble a developed economy.

== Criticism ==
The theory is complicated by the fact that surplus labour is both generated by the introduction of new productivity enhancing technologies in the agricultural sector and the intensification of work.

The wage differential between industry and agriculture needs to be sufficient to incentivise movement between the sectors and, whereas the model assumes any differential will result in a transfer.

The model assumes rationality, perfect information and unlimited capital formation in industry. These do not exist in practical situations and so the full extent of the model is rarely realised. However, the model does provide a good general theory on labour transition in developing economies.

== Practical application ==
This model has been employed quite successfully in Singapore and helps explain the rapid growth in countries like the UK during the industrial revolution.

== See also ==
- Shadow wage
