= Aaron S. Williams =

American diplomat

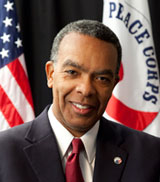

18th Director of the Peace Corps
- In office August 7, 2009 – September 17, 2012
- President: Barack Obama
- Preceded by: Ron Tschetter
- Succeeded by: Carrie Hessler-Radelet

Personal details
- Born: Chicago
- Education: Chicago State University; University of Wisconsin
- Profession: International development

Aaron S. Williams is an international development expert and a former diplomat. He served as the 18th Director of the Peace Corps from 2009 to 2012 under President Barack Obama.

Williams grew up in Chicago where he graduated from Chicago State University and became a teacher. He volunteered for the Peace Corps for three years, working in the Dominican Republic to support teacher training projects. Afterwards, Williams served in the U.S. Agency for International Development (US AID) for 22 years. Before and after his term as Director of the Peace Corps, Williams worked for RTI International.

Williams announced August 21, 2012 that he was leaving his post after three years, citing personal and family considerations in his letter of resignation to President Barack Obama.

== Early life and education ==
Aaron Williams grew up in a family of modest means in South Side, Chicago. There, he attended Chicago State University, earning a bachelor's degree in Geography and Education. He later earned an MBA from the University of Wisconsin - Madison.

== Career ==
Williams began his career as a high school teacher in Chicago. He decided to volunteer for the Peace Corps after hearing speeches by President Kennedy and Sargent Shriver, and then talking to a fellow teacher from the same alma mater that had volunteered in Jamaica. Williams supported the Peace Corps in the Dominican Republic for three years. While there, he taught rural school teachers seeking high school diplomas, then worked with the Ministry of Education on developing educational curriculum. Williams also trained teachers for the country's first private university, Universidad Madre y Maestra. Then, Williams returned to the United States and served the Peace Corps as a Coordinator of Minority Recruitment.

In 1978 Williams joined the U.S. Agency for International Development (US AID), where he worked for 22 years, as a foreign service officer. At USAID, Williams created partnerships with the private sector in Haiti and Costa Rica. He was promoted to Director of the Private Sector Office in the Latin America and the Caribbean Bureau. Then he was promoted to senior management positions, serving as the Mission Director for the Eastern Caribbean Region based in Barbados, Deputy Assistant Administrator for Latin America and the Caribbean (LAC), Assistant Administrator for LAC, and as the head of the Executive Secretariat for USAID. He also attained the rank of career minister in the Senior Foreign Service. When Williams left USAID, his title was Mission Director to South Africa. In 2000, Williams left USAID to become Executive Vice President at the International Youth Foundation (IYF), a transnational nonprofit that focuses on leveraging corporate donations to assist young people in the developing world. In December 2003, partly to reduce his heavy travel load, William left IYF to become a vice president for International Business Development with RTI International, a nonprofit research corporation that depends on USAID contracts for about one-third of its revenues. Williams then worked for RTI International as Vice President of International Business Development from 2003 to 2009. In July 2009, President Barack Obama nominated Williams, a career international development specialist, to serve as the new director of the Peace Corps. The nomination was confirmed by the U.S. Senate on August 7, 2009. On August 25, 2009, Mr. Williams was sworn in as the eighteenth Director of the Peace Corps. Williams is the fourth director in the Peace Corps’ history to have served as a Peace Corps Volunteer. At the time there was a problem with Peace Corps volunteers being sexually assaulted abroad. Williams testified to a congressional panel that the Peace Corps had not done enough to protect its volunteers and he would make it a priority to change that. Williams worked with Congress to institute reforms, such as heightened security, training and support for victims.

As the Peace Corps Director, Williams re-opened Peace Corps programs in Colombia, Sierra, and Indonesia. Additionally, under his tenure the Peace Corps expanded its operations into Tunisia and Nepal. Peace Corps also expanded and created new programs in Africa, through partnerships with the President's Emergency Plan for AIDS Relief, the President's Malaria Initiative and the Feed the Future Initiative. Williams resigned from the Peace Corps effective September 17, 2012 and returned to RTI International in the position of executive vice president of the international development group.

In 2018, Williams was awarded emeritus status by RTI International for his career in public service.

== Personal life ==
Williams is fluent in Spanish. He met his wife, Rosa, during his service as a volunteer in the Dominican Republic; they have two sons.

Government offices
Preceded by Ron Tschetter	Director of the Peace Corps; 2009–2012	Succeeded by Carrie Hessler-Radelet
