= Harris–Todaro model =

Economic model

The Harris–Todaro model, named after John R. Harris and Michael Todaro, is an economic model developed in 1970 and used in development economics and welfare economics to explain some of the issues concerning rural-urban migration. The main assumption of the model is that the migration decision is based on expected income differentials between rural and urban areas rather than just wage differentials. This implies that rural-urban migration in a context of high urban unemployment can be economically rational if expected urban income exceeds expected rural income.

== Overview ==
In the model, an equilibrium is reached when the expected wage in urban areas (actual wage adjusted for the unemployment rate), is equal to the marginal product of an agricultural worker. The model assumes that unemployment is non-existent in the rural agricultural sector. It is also assumed that rural agricultural production and the subsequent labor market is perfectly competitive. As a result, the agricultural rural wage is equal to agricultural marginal productivity. In equilibrium, the rural to urban migration rate will be zero since the expected rural income equals the expected urban income. However, in this equilibrium there will be positive unemployment in the urban sector. The model explains internal migration in China as the regional income gap has been proved to be a primary drive of rural-urban migration, while urban unemployment is local governments' main concern in many cities.

== Formalism ==
The formal statement of the equilibrium condition of the Harris–Todaro model is as follows:

- Let $\ w_A$ be the wage rate (marginal productivity of labor) in the rural agricultural sector.
- Let $\ L_F$ be the total number of jobs available in the formal urban sector.
- Let $\ L_I$ be the total number of jobs available in the informal urban sector.
- Let $\ w_F$ be the wage rate in the formal urban sector, which could possibly be set by government with a minimum wage law.
- Let $\ w_I$ be the wage rate in the informal urban sector.

Rural to urban migration will take place if:

$$\ w_A < \frac{L_F}{L_F+L_I} w_F + \frac{L_I}{{L_F}+{L_I}} w_I$$

Conversely, urban to rural migration will occur if:

$$\ w_A > \frac{L_F}{L_F+L_I} w_F + \frac{L_I}{{L_F}+{L_I}} w_I$$

At equilibrium,

$$\ w_A = \frac{L_F}{L_F+L_I} w_F + \frac{L_I}{{L_F}+{L_I}} w_I$$

With the random matching of workers to available jobs, the ratio of available jobs to total job seekers gives the probability that any person moving from the agricultural sector to the urban sector will be able to find a job. As a result, in equilibrium, the agricultural wage rate is equal to the expected urban wage rate, which is the urban wage multiplied by the employment rate.

== Conclusions ==
Therefore, migration from rural areas to urban areas will increase if:

- Wages increase in the urban sector, increasing the expected urban income.
- Agricultural productivity decreases, lowering marginal productivity and wages in the agricultural sector (w_{A}), decreasing the expected rural income.

However, even though this migration creates unemployment and induces informal sector growth, this behavior is economically rational and utility-maximizing in the context of the Harris–Todaro model. As long as the migrating economic agents have complete and accurate information concerning rural and urban wage rates and probabilities of obtaining employment, they will make an expected income-maximizing decision.

== See also ==
- Shadow wage
