= John Sutton (economist) =

Irish economist (born 1948)

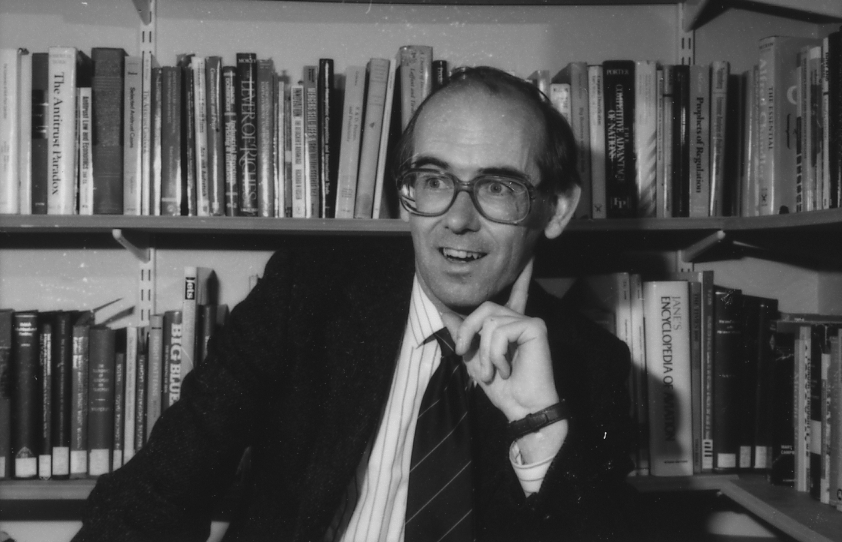
- Born: August 10, 1948 (age 78)
- Citizenship: Irish

Academic background
- Education: University College Dublin (BSc); Trinity College Dublin (MSc); University of Sheffield (PhD)

Academic work
- Discipline: Industrial organization
- Institutions: London School of Economics

John Sutton (born 10 August 1948) is the Sir John Hicks Emeritus Professor of Economics at the London School of Economics.

== Education ==
Sutton received his undergraduate education at University College Dublin, a graduate degree from Trinity College Dublin, and earned his Phd at University of Sheffield.

== Career ==
He taught at the University of Sheffield before joining LSE in 1977. He has been a visiting associate professor at Tokyo University, a Marvin Bower Fellow at the Harvard Business School, and a visiting professor of economics at Harvard University, and at the Graduate School of Business, University of Chicago.

Sutton was also president of the Royal Economic Society from 2004 to 2007. He is a Foreign Honorary Member of the American Economic Association and a member of Executive and Supervisory Committee at CERGE-EI in Prague.
