= Steven Radelet =

American economist

Academic background
- Education: Central Michigan University Harvard University

Academic work
- Discipline: International Development, Macroeconomics, Economic Growth, Foreign Aid
- Institutions: Georgetown University

Steven Radelet is an American economist working within the field of International Development. He holds the Donald F. McHenry Chair in Global Human Development and is also the Director of the Global Human Development Program (GHDP) at Georgetown University, a program of the Edmund A. Walsh School of Foreign Service.

President Ellen Johnson Sirleaf of Liberia called Radelet "one of the leading development thinkers and practitioners in the world today." He has worked as an adviser to governments, in academia at Georgetown and Harvard University, and in senior-level U.S. government positions at USAID, the State Department and the Treasury. In addition to his experience as a practitioner, he has published and contributed to a number of books and articles in academic journals and fora.

== Professional background ==
Dr. Radelet earned his B.S. in mathematics from Central Michigan University in 1979. He then earned his M.P.P. in 1986 from Harvard University's Kennedy School of Government before going on to finish his Ph.D. in Public Policy in 1990. He wrote his dissertation, titled Economic Recovery in The Gambia: The Anatomy of an Economic Reform Program, on the country's response to its economic crisis.

== Career ==
Radelet began his career in international development in 1981 when he served as a Peace Corps volunteer in Western Samoa with his wife, Carrie Hessler-Radelet. After returning to the US and completing his doctorate, he stayed at Harvard University for 12 years to serve in a number of roles, including as the Director of the Macroeconomics Program at the Harvard Institute for International Development (HIID) and as a lecturer in the Economics Department and the Kennedy School of Government. During his tenure with HIID, Radelet spent four years as resident adviser to the Ministry of Finance in Jakarta, Indonesia, and two years with the Ministry of Finance and Trade in The Gambia.

Radelet joined the Georgetown faculty in 2012 after serving as the Chief Economist of the United States Agency for International Development (USAID) where he worked with former Administrator Rajiv Shah on the launch of Feed the Future, an initiative focusing on agricultural production and farming communities. He previously served as Senior Adviser for Development to Secretary of State Hillary Clinton, Deputy Assistant Secretary of the Treasury (1999–2002) and as a Senior Fellow at the Center for Global Development (2002–09).

Radelet served as an economic adviser to President Ellen Johnson Sirleaf of Liberia from 2005 to 2017, and worked in a similar role for the Government of Malawi from 2012 to 2014. He also acts as a Non-Resident Fellow at the Brookings Institution. In 2017 President Ellen Johnson Sirleaf inducted him as Knight Officer in the Most Venerable Order of Knighthood of the Pioneers of the Republic of Liberia.

He has served on the advisory council for the Millennium Campus Network, The ONE Campaign (2005–2009), the Commission on Weak States and National Security (2003), the United Nations Task Force on Global Poverty Reduction (2003), the UNDP Human Development Report (2003), the Asian Development Bank Poverty Reduction Strategy (2003), Merck Incorporated's Vaccines Advisory Board (2003–2006), and the Chicago Council on Foreign Affairs Global Agriculture Division (2013–17). He has also served on the board of directors at the Center for U.S. Global Engagement from 2005 – 2010 and Chaired the International Working Group on Challenges and Opportunities for the executive director of the Global Fund to fight AIDS, Tuberculosis, and Malaria (2005). He also co-founded and co-chaired the Modernizing Foreign Assistance Network (MFAN) from 2008 – 2010.

== Publications ==
Radelet is the author, co-author, or editor of seven books and dozens of academic articles. He has contributed to debates and discussions at the IMF, World Bank, Cato Institute, the Council on Foreign Relations and other research institutions in addition to participating in a variety of speaking engagements, including a TedX talk at Georgetown University. He has testified for the United States Congress on several occasions.

In a review of his book The Great Surge, Bono, lead singer of U2 and co-founder of The ONE Campaign and (RED), stated: "With his typical care and detail, Steve describes humanity’s greatest hits over the last twenty years".

=== Selected works ===
- Radelet, Steven. The Great Surge: The Ascent of the Developing World. New York: Simon & Schuster, 2015.
- Perkins, Dwight, Steven Radelet, David Lindauer, and Stephen Block. Economics of Development, Seventh Edition. New York: W.W. Norton & Co., 2012.
- Radelet, Steven. Emerging Africa: How 17 Countries Are Leading the Way. Washington: Center for Global Development, 2010.
- Radelet, Steven, and Jeffrey Sachs. The Onset of the East Asian Financial Crisis. No. w6680. National Bureau of Economic Research, 1998. doi:10.3386/w6680
- Radelet, Steven, and Jeffrey Sachs. 1998. The East Asian Financial Crisis: Diagnosis, Remedies, Prospects. Brookings Papers on Economic Activity 1: 1998, pp. 1–74.

== Awards ==
He and his co-authors won the Royal Economic Society Prize, an annual award bestowed upon the author(s) of the best paper published in the Economic Journal, in 2012 for their article Counting Chickens When They Hatch: Timing and the Effects of Aid on Growth.
