= Center for Policy Studies =

Central European University organization

- Established: 2000
- Address: Central European University Nador Street 9 H-1051 Budapest Hungary
- Location: Budapest, Hungary
- Website: Center for Policy Studies

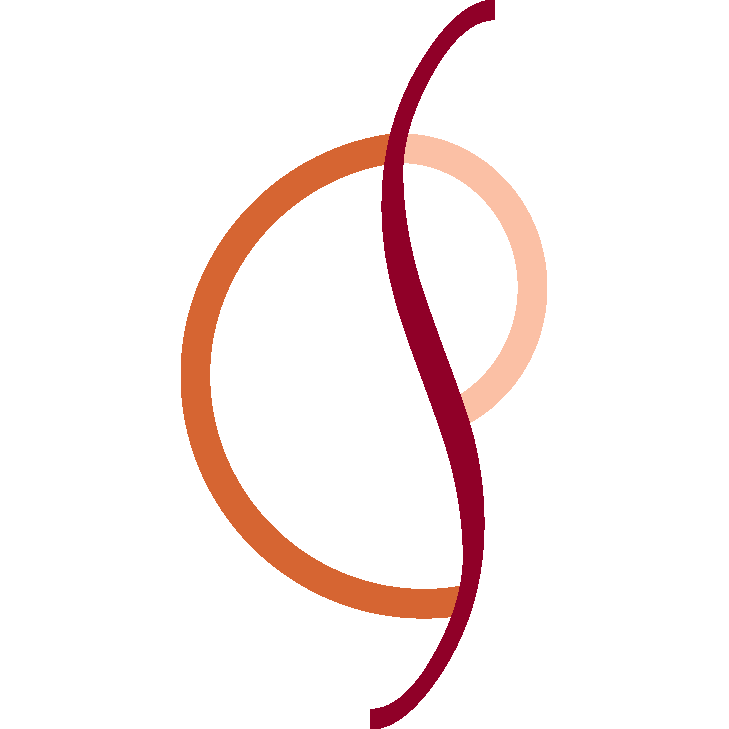
Center for Policy Studies

The Center for Policy Studies (CPS) is an academic unit within Central European University, dedicated to improving the quality of governance in Central and Eastern Europe and the former Soviet Union by the provision of independent public policy analysis and advice.

The center believes that the experiences of post-socialist transition can be usefully shared with countries enduring great social transformation, but that the translation of these local experiences requires a sound appreciation of policy contexts. The center is committed to strengthen local capacity for critical policy analysis and to pursue research projects and publication that draw on its existing multi-disciplinary resources from law, economics, political science and sociology but also from its connections with open society driven partners. The center conduct interdisciplinary research projects in cooperation with both Central European University and external partners from Europe and beyond on a wide range of topics within four broad research programs (see following). Each program benefits from expertise of CPS staff and a network of external researchers, and usually includes several ongoing research projects. Its research is comparative, methodologically diverse and policy oriented, and provides critical perspectives on the formulation, production and implementation of public policy.

== Areas of research ==
- Equality and Social Justice.

Since its launch, CPS has been active in the broader field of social diversity and policy responses to status based inequalities. Research and capacity building efforts within the center have mainly concerned gender, disability, ethnicity and race and multiple disadvantages resulting from the intersection of these inequality grounds. The activities within the unit focus on a series of topics such as educational segregation, policy responses to intersecting inequalities and violence against women including domestic violence and trafficking, theory and practice of gender mainstreaming, the impact of the economic crisis on equality policies, radical right ideologies and their implications for equality policies. The center addresses these topics both as research themes and as subjects for policy analysis and capacity building. Since 2003, the center carried out various research projects under the research field. As of 2019, there are four ongoing research projects: Gender Equality Academy (GE Academy), Future Challenges to Education Systems in Central Eastern European Context (EDUC), Building Resilience Against Violent Extremism and Polarisation (BRaVE) and Employment of non-local temporary workers and its impact on local industrial relations in the Hungarian automotive industry.https://cps.ceu.edu/research/local-industrial-relations The details and related publications are available and updated on the CPS website.

- Governance and Participation.

CPS advocates that good governance needs to address contemporary forms of representation and participation which are pertinent to the responsiveness of state and private institutions but also the institutional basis for vulnerable people to claim rights and services. The unit's research examines how non-traditional policy actors shape policy processes, how implementation agencies consultative bodies combine state and non-state actors, and offer voice for vulnerable groups and how transnational advocacy networks influence policy development.

- Social Policy and Welfare Regimes.

The CPS applies its cross-sectoral and multi-actor approaches to address outstanding issues of social policy development in European and post-socialist contexts, often embedding those issues in wider global debates. The Center has developed expertise and gained recognition in investigating interethnic relations in educational systems and policies. It has engaged in larger comparative research projects on European labor markets with special attention to labor market integration of different vulnerable and often discriminated social groups, such as the Roma, migrants, and refugees. Inter-ethnic relations, gender equality, and intergenerational justice issues are investigated in the context of shifting care regimes in Europe. The CPS is also engaged in studying the transformation of labor relations, labor representation, and the governance structure of multinational companies and their subsidiaries in Central and Eastern Europe.

- Territory and Development Policy.

CPS believes that uneven economic development is a cross-cutting field which analyses processes which create major spatial inequalities within between countries. With a special focus on urban/rural divides and the creation of left behind zones, this field of research offers a comparative study of domestic, national and European policy responses.

== Publications ==
=== CPS Books ===
The book collection of institutional publications of the Center for Policy Studies include the volumes edited and published by the Center for Policy Studies.

- Gendering Democratic Backsliding in Central and Eastern Europe. A comparative agenda, 2019: This book aims to map gendered aspects of the decline in democracy in four countries in the Central and Eastern European region: Croatia, Hungary, Poland and Romania. It adopts a dual focus. First, it looks at how processes of de-democratization affect previously established gender equality rights and what forms gender policy backsliding takes in the region. It scrutinizes how governments operate to block or reverse gender equality policies and what specific policy fields or issues are most under attack. Are policies actively removed or do we see more subtle dismantling strategies? Also, it explores if these dynamics and mechanisms are country specific or whether similar patterns across countries could be found? Second, it examines how these developments affect defenders and promoters of gender rights. How do women movements respond to these attacks? Do they change strategies? Do they falter in hostile conditions or we see resistance, maturing, diversifying coalition capacities? What do the anti-gender attacks and hostile states mean for movement capacities and strategies? Introduction provides a conceptual framework for the analysis. Separate chapters discuss gendered dynamics of de-democratization in the four countries.
- Challenging the Political Across Borders: Migrants’ and Solidarity Struggles, 2019: The book examines the practices, structures, and meanings of solidarity with and by migrants and refugees in Europe and beyond. Bringing together empirical, conceptual and historical insights, the volume interrogates struggles unfolding on the ground and situates them within a critical analysis of historical and current mobility regimes, and how these have been resisted.
- Child Trafficking in Hungary: Sexual Exploitation, Forced Begging and Pickpocketing, 2015: This study explores the mechanisms of three forms of child trafficking in Hungary – begging, pickpocketing and sexual exploitation of children – by focusing on Roma victims. It presents available statistical data on human trafficking and sheds light on some of the major difficulties of data collection regarding human trafficking and child trafficking in particular. It gives an overview of the anti-human trafficking and anti-child trafficking policy frameworks, and it tries to reveal what factors lead to victimisation and how recruitment and exploitation of children actually take place. The study then looks into how the identification of victims, the referral mechanism, and the victim assistance systems all work. Finally, it identifies shortcomings in the criminal processes and the judicial system that undermine effective countering of child trafficking.
- Mobilizing for Policy Change: Women's Movements in Central and Eastern European Domestic Violence Policy Struggles, 2015: The aim of this edited volume is to explore and understand the influence of women's movement mobilization on domestic violence policy change in Central and Eastern Europe. his volume addresses a series of questions: what are the dynamics that led to movement successes in the region? Which movements and the strategies they adopt are successful in promoting progressive policy change? Why do some movements manage to secure policy change that is women's rights friendly, while others lose control beyond setting the agenda? How do alliances, institutionalization and framing make a difference? And how patterns of achieving policy influence resemble or differ from patterns found in Western post-industrialized states? Are Central and Eastern European domestic violence policy processes any different? The book develops a theoretical framework explaining the links between mobilization and change, followed by the portrayal of in-depth case studies on Bulgaria, Croatia, Poland, and Romania.
- Different Horizons: Aid, Trade and Official Development Assistance in Hungary, 2014: The book focuses on the constantly changing nature of state development assistance through Turkey, Brazil and Venezuela and the central and eastern members of the European Union. It posits that some of these new donors were themselves recipients of grant, cheap loans and technical assistance. Their status as emerging democracies or transition countries gives them an alternative perspective on development co-operation and external support, and for some of the more established international development organizations, this can translate into a different kind of solidarity, less tinged with ambivalent post-colonial relations. In this context, the book explores who are these new development actors and how far are they working to traditional models of development assistance and support? What is the actual meaning of partnership within countries and between countries? How does one country get to be a priority partner and what does the general public think of all these efforts to improve living standards abroad?

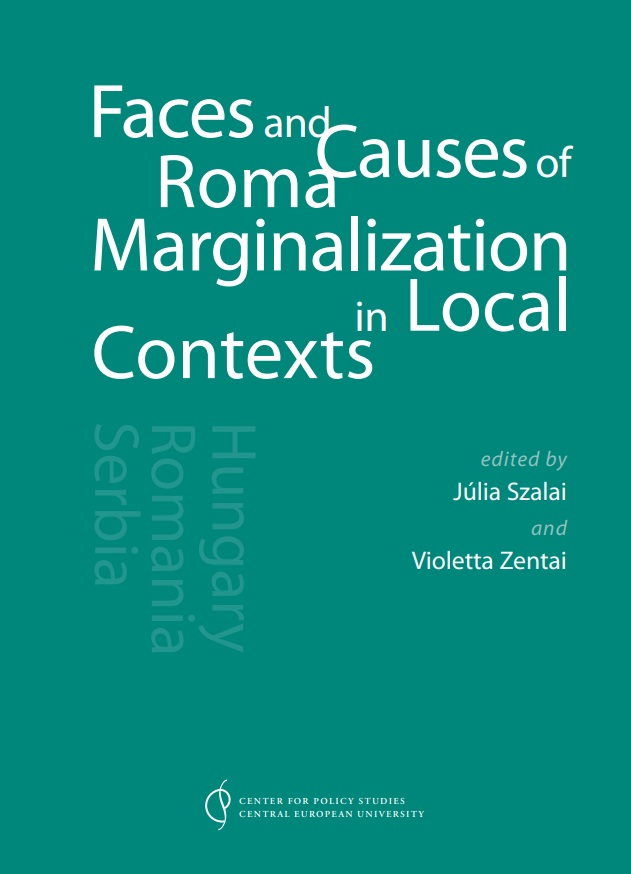
Faces and Causes of Roma Marginalization in Local Context. Hungary, Romania, Serbia

- Faces and Causes of Roma Marginalization in Local Contexts: Hungary, Romania, Serbia, 2014: The research endeavor explored the key factors perpetuating Roma marginalization at the municipal and community level in three countries of Central and Eastern Europe: Hungary, Romania and Serbia. It sought to analyze the economic, political, demographic, and social forces at local level which shape practices and consequences of social exclusion and potential pathways to inclusion. A multi-layered approach was designed to implement this research idea: the locality (municipality) of ethnically mixed communities composed the first level; the Roma communities, neighborhoods or segments of selected localities were examined as the second level; and inter-ethnic relations within the selected localities were identified as the third level of the research approach. This volume presents the country studies and a comparative analysis about local communities that mobilize a variety of means and actions to either maintain clear-cut ethnic distinctions or to move toward a certain degree of inclusion.
- Facing the Far-Right. Ethnographic portrayals of local civil resistance, 2014: Interethnic relations of Roma and non-Roma in Hungary are marked by a long history of local (ethnic) conflicts since the regime change of 1989. Conflicts persist to this day, although they are changing in nature. From the mid-2000s, Hungary has seen a political crisis leading to the rise of the extreme right, accompanied by a ‘racial turn’ in mainstream discourses and in certain policy areas. Political changes, in turn, have also shaped the nature of local ethnic conflicts. The usual scenario is that the far right, through its unofficial paramilitary organizations, has been organizing hate marches in local communities with ethnically mixed populations to mobilize locals and instigate hatred against the Roma in order to win the political support of the majority. With the two anthropological case studies presented in this volume the book offers some insight into this issue through the analysis and portrayal of some ‘best practices’ of Roma self-mobilization and local civil resistance to the far-right. In addition, it explores how local communities where the far-right had organized demonstrations and hate marches have been subverted, how social ties were torn and, in general, what social, moral and symbolic damages have been done within the communities following these events.
- Roma Migration to and from Canada: The Czech, Hungarian and Slovak Case, 2013: Unlike most research initiatives on Roma migration that focus on Roma migrating from non-EU to EU or EU-to-EU countries, this research aimed to look at another sub-component of the migration process: transatlantic, Canadian migration from the Czech Republic, Hungary and Slovakia. The premise was that 'Canadian Roma migration' should be understood as a process motivated by a mixed set of factors and, from an analytical point of view, it should be studied as neither refugee nor labor migration but as a compound of both. The first two studies in the volume investigate the legal and the political components to the push and pull of Roma migration, while the rest of the papers are based on qualitative, empirical studies that were conducted in three CEE countries – the Czech Republic, Hungary, and Slovakia – as well as in Canada. The country case studies were designed to consider Roma migration from a micro perspective using the same methodology and the same conceptual framework. Researchers in the three countries did fieldwork in villages and towns in which there had been a significant out-migration of Roma, presently or in the past.

=== Policy Briefs ===
- RESLEU European Policy Brief, 2017
- IR-Multiling Project Recommendations / IR-Multiling Eredmények és Ajánlások, 2016
- Vulnerability of Roma' and Anti-Human Trafficking Policies in Serbia: Recommendations to the National Policy Network, 2015
- Challenges to Preliminary Identification of "Victims" of Forced Marriage and Forced Begging in Serbia: Recommendations to Anti-Trafficking Policy Actors, 2015
- Human Trafficking and Online Networks, 2014
- Patterns of Roma Employment in Europe, 2014
- Women on the European Labour Market, 2014
- Applying Tolerance Indicators: Roma School Segregation, 2013
- New Knowledge about Hungary, 2013
- The Rise of the Extreme Right in Hungary and the Roma Question: The Radicalization of Media Discourse, 2012
- Ethnic Differences in Education and Diverging Prospects for Urban Youth in an Enlarged Europe, 2011
- Friendly Neighbours: Increasing the Potential of European Neighbourhood Policy Cross-Border Cooperation Initiatives, 2011
- Interactions between the Ethnic Composition in School and Students' Performance, Self-esteem and Future Aspirations, 2010
- How Do Schools in Old and New Member States of the EU Treat Minority Ethnic Youth and Shape Their Performance?, 2009
- Ethnic Differences in Compulsory Education, 2008
- DIOSCURI Policy Recommendations, 2007
- Women, Integration and Prison; Policy Recommendations for Hungary, 2005

=== Working Papers and Reports ===
- The connotations of collaboration: European linguistic and scholarly perspectives on collaborative governance, 2019'
- Counter-Islamophobia Kit: Key National Messages – Hungary // A projekt legfőbb megállapításai - Magyarország, 2018
- Post-crisis politics, social resistance, and equality policy paths: New social movements and forms of citizens’ cooperation for solidarity, 2018
- Programmatic Europeanization revisited: The role of EP election proximity, EU support and Eastern European patterns, 2018
- Counter-Islamophobia Kit: Dominant Counter - Narratives to Islamophobia – Hungary, 2018
- Communicating Cohesion in Eastern Europe. The Cases of Romania, Hungary and Slovenia, 2018
- The politics of refugee solidarity in Greece: Bordered identities and political mobilization, 2018
- Involving Others: Assessing efforts to improve the schooling experience of Hungarian Roma children through focused teacher training and afternoon schooling programs, 2017
- Cohesion Policy and Perceptions of the European Union in Hungary. A Cultural Political Economy Approach, 2017
- Backsliding in area of constitutional safeguards and independent institutions, corruption control, and general equality and minorities, 2017
- Solidarity in the treatment of mental illness in Hungary: A case study of the Awakenings Foundation as a vehicle for change, 2017
- Counter-Islamophobia Kit: Dominant Islamophobic Narratives - Hungary, 2017
- Invisible Denizens: Migrant Night Shift Workers’ Fragile Possibilities for Solidarity in the Post-Circadian Capitalist Era, 2017
- The Hungarian border spectacle: Migration, repression and solidarity in two Hungarian border cities, 2017'
- Solidarity in the housing sector: Civic responses to homelessness and housing poverty in Hungary, 2017
- Roma employment and the potentials of state and business actors in labor market inclusion, 2017
- Contested forms of solidarity: An overview of civil society organisations in Hungary and their impact on policy and the social economy, 2017
- Solidarity at the border: The organization of spontaneous support for transiting refugees in two Hungarian towns in the summer of 2015, 2017
- Industrial Relations in Car-manufacturing Industry: a Comparative Case Study of Audi Hungaria, Gyor and Mercedes Benz, Kecskemet, 2016
- Union Organizing in the Automotive Industry in Slovakia in Times of Crisis: Do They Help Workers or Protect Themselves?, 2016
- Tensions in the Periphery: Dependence and the Trajectory of a Low-Cost Productive Model in the Central and Eastern European Automotive Industry, 2016
- Trade Union Strategies in a Time of Economic Crisis: the Case of a Car Assembly Plant in Poland, 2016
- Feet of Clay? The Political Economy of Adopting and Abolishing Private Pensions, 2016
- Every word has its special weight'. A qualitative case study of multilingual realities at Siemens, Hungary, 2016
- In a corporate environment, we need to be inclusive'. Toward understanding multinational companies' practices of multilingualism and cultural diversity, 2016
- Industrial Relations in Multilingual Environments at Work, 2016
- Mapping Backsliding in the European Union, 2016
- Multilingualism in Hungary: Practices and Perspectives, 2016
- Report of Case Studies on Gender Equality as a Focus Point of National and Nativist Discourses, 2016
- State, Crisis and Politicization of Economic Policymaking: Reflections from Hungary and Turkey, 2015
- Challenges to Preliminary Identification of Romani 'Victims of Trafficking': The Serbian Case, 2015
- What Really is a Pension Crisis? A Theoretical Argument on the Link Between Ageing, Productivity, and Retirement, 2015
- Evaluating the Evaluators: When and How Does the World Bank Evaluate Its Projects in the Western Balkans, 2015
- Vulnerability of Roma' in Policy Discourse on Combatting Trafficking in Human Beings in Serbia: Perspectives of the National Policy Actors, 2015
- Intersections of Gender, Ethnicity, and Class: History and Future of the Romani Women's Movement, 2015
- Leaving 'Roma' Behind. Notes on the Impact of Housing and (Forced) Mobility on Education, 2015
- Decentralization, Union Power and Contention Episodes: the Case of Dacia Workers, 2015
- Integration of Vulnerable Migrants: Women, Children and Victims of Trafficking (Hungary), 2015
- IR-Multiling National Report: Hungary, 2015
- Understanding Public Knowledge and Attitudes towards Trafficking in Human Beings. Part 2, 2015
- Gender equality and care choices in the light of population ageing, 2014
- Migrant domestic care workers: state and market-based policy mix, 2014
- The role of migrant labour in meeting European care demand, 2014
- Half-in, Half-out: Roma and Non-Roma Romanians with Limited Rights Working and Travelling in the European Union, 2014
- Early School Leaving in the Context of Policy-making in Hungary, 2014
- Europe In Crisis: Addressing Changing Patterns Through Innovation, 2014
- Review of Existing Monitoring Mechanisms for the Integration of Migrants in Hungary, 2014
- Understanding Public Knowledge and Attitudes towards Trafficking in Human Beings. Part 1, 2014
- Gender dimension of the labour markets over the past two decades, 2013
- Overview of the Labor Market Situation of Low-Educated and Roma Population and Regulations Affecting their Employment, 2013
- Pushed to the Edge. Research Report on the Representation of Roma Communities in the Hungarian Majority Media, 2011, 2013
- From benefits to brooms. Case study reports on the implementation of active labour market policies for Roma at local level, 2013
- Active Labor Market Policies with an Impact Potential on Roma Employment in Five Countries of the EU, 2013
- Critical Frame Analysis: A Comparative Methodology for the 'Quality in Gender+ Equality Policies' (QUING) project, 2012
- The Radicalization of Media Discourse. The Rise of the Extreme Right in Hungary and the Roma Question, 2012
- Derangement or Development? Political Economy of EU Structural Funds Allocation in New Member States - Insights from the Hungarian Case, 2011
- Dynamics of European migration. A comparative assessment of Croatia, Bulgaria and Hungary, 2011
- Multinational Corporations and National Business Systems: Integration or Separation, 2011
- Rural Out Migration and Land Use in Moldova, 2011
- The Embodiment of (in)Tolerance in Discourses and Practices Addressing Cultural Diversity in Schools in Hungary. The Case of Roma, 2011
- Tolerance and Cultural Diversity Discourses in Hungary, 2011
- Being ‘Visibly Different’: Experiences of Second-generation Migrant and Roma Youths at School, 2010
- Bread baskets, fuel supplies and bio tech crops: Will the Central and Eastern European countries take part in the second Green Revolution?, 2010
- Ethnic and Social Differences in Education in a Comparative Perspective, 2010
- Interactions Between the Ethnic Composition in School and Students’ Performance, Self-esteem and Future Aspirations, 2010
- Franchizing Frenchness: What Social Models Do French-dominated Multinational Companies Bring to Hungary?, 2010
- Immigration and Health Care: A Case Study of the Spanish Experience, 2010
- Inheritance Matters. Changing Land Use Trends Amongst the Elderly in Rural Hungary, 2010
- Italian Immigration Policy: Access to Health Care and the Foreign Workforce, 2010
- Return to Europe. Reflections after 20 Years of Democratic Renewal, 2010
- The Political Background of Structural Changes in the Educational System of Hungary, 1985-1994, 2010
- Comparative Report on Education, 2009
- Comparative Report on Educational Policies for Inclusion, 2009
- Comparative Report on Ethnic Relations, 2009
- Missing Intersectionality: Race/Ethnicity, Gender, and Class in Current Research and Policies on Romani Women in Europe, 2009
- Fostering Civic Participation in The Policy Process in Hungary: a Short Review of Policy and Practice, 2008
- Promoting Social Capital Through Public Policy in Hungary; the 2004 National Development Plan, 2008
- The Impact of Civic Engagement on The Quality of Life in Hungary, 2008
- Social Capital, Diversity and Trust in Hungary: Two Case Studies, 2008
- Monitoring Social Capital in Hungary: A Short Review of Recent Research, 2008
- Controlled Decentralization. Local, Regional, and Central Power in the Making of Hungarian Regional Development Policy, 2008
- Monitoring EU Spending in Hungary, 2008
- Social Capital and the Delivery of Social Services in Hungary: Review of Recent Research and Practice, 2008
- Social Capital and the Integration of Minorities and Immigrants in Hungary, 2008
- DIOSCURI Final Project Report, 2007
- Quality in Gender+ Equality Policies: State of the Art and Mapping of Competences Report: Bulgaria, 2007
- Quality in Gender+ Equality Policies: State of the Art and Mapping of Competences Report: Hungary, 2007
- Quality in Gender+ Equality Policies: State of the Art and Mapping of Competences Report: Latvia, 2007
- Quality in Gender+ Equality Policies: State of the Art and Mapping of Competences Report: Lithuania, 2007
- Quality in Gender+ Equality Policies: State of the Art and Mapping of Competences Report: Poland, 2007
- Quality in Gender+ Equality Policies: State of the Art and Mapping of Competences Report: Romania, 2007
- Social Network Analysis of Regional Policy Making in South Transdanubia, Hungary, 2007
- Social Network Analysis of Regional Policy Making in the Northern Great Plain Region of Hungary, 2007
- Social Capital, Regional Development, and Europeanization in Hungary. A Literature Review, 2006
- The European Future of Turkey and Ukraine: The Policy Debate in Hungary, 2006
- The Roma in Hungary: Socio-economic Status, Human Rights Protection and Migratory Dynamics. An Annotated Bibliography of Recent Research, 2006
- Anti-Americanism and International Security: Indications in International Public Opinion, 2005
- Anti-Americanism and Popular Culture, 2005
- Anti-Americanism and Regionalism in East Asia, 2005
- Anti-Americanism in Canada, 2005
- Roma Women's Unemployment in Hungary, 2005
- Transferring Expertise and Methodologies: A Case Study of the Development of ‘Quarterly Economic Indicators’ and Forecasting Skills in Moldova and Kazakhstan, 2005
- US-Latin American Trade Relations: Path to the Future or Dead End Street?, 2005
- Women, Integration and Prison; Comparative Report - Full Version, 2005
- From the Ground Up. Assessing the Record of Anticorruption Assistance in Southeastern Europe, 2004
- Past and present: Is there anything new with anti-Americanism today?, 2004
- Selling Americanism, Combatting Anti-Americanism: The Historical Role of American Foundations, 2004
- Social Capital in Central and Eastern Europe. A Critical Assessment and Literature Review, 2004
- Social Capital Research in Central and Eastern Europe and the Former Soviet Union. An Annotated Bibliography, 2004
- Terror and Governance, 2004
- The Trans-Atlantic Relationship in the Post-Cold War International Relations, 2004
- In Search of Responsive Government. State Building and Economic Growth in the Balkans, 2003
- Social Capital in the Balkans: The Missing Link?, 2003
- Xenophobia in Hungary: A Regional Comparison. Systemic Sources and Possible Solutions, 2003
- Ethnic Violence and Justice, 2002
- Nation-building Versus State-building in the Balkans. Lessons Learned, 2002
- Understanding Xenophobia in Eastern Europe, 2002
- Reshaping Globalization: Multilateral Dialogues and New Policy Initiatives, 2002

=== Books from Other Publishers ===
CPS academic staff also publish books through renown publishers, and here they take a very active role in the preparation of volumes, in editing, and in the overall preparation of the manuscript for publication.

- Policy Experiments, Failures and Innovations: Beyond Accession in Central and Eastern Europe, 2018
- The Gender Politics of Domestic Violence: Feminists Engaging the State in Central and Eastern Europe, 2018
- The Romani Women's Movement: Struggles and Debates in Central and Eastern Europe, 2018
- Migrant, Roma and Post-Colonial Youth in Education across Europe. Being 'Visibly Different', 2014
- Developing Open, Rule-based, Predictable, Non-discriminatory Trade Relations with Priority ODA Recipients, 2013
- The Role of Civil Society in Development Assistance and Aid Effectiveness, 2013
- The Role of the Private Sector in Development Assistance and Effectiveness, 2013
- Capitalism from Outside? Economic Cultures in Eastern Europe after 1989, 2012
- Democracy's New Champions. European Democracy Assistance after EU Enlargement, 2008
- Finding the Money: Public Accountability and Service Efficiency through Fiscal Transparency, 2008
- Multiple Meanings of Gender Equality: A Critical Frame Analysis of Gender Policies in Europe, 2007
- EU Accession Prospect for Turkey and Ukraine. Debates in New Member States, 2006
- The World Bank and Governance. A Decade of Reform and Reaction, 2006
- Global Knowledge Networks and International Development, 2005
- SAPARD Review in Bulgaria, Czech Republic, Estonia, Hungary, Latvia, Poland and Romania, 2005
- Women Integration & Prison, 2005
- Follow the Money: A Guide to Monitoring Budgets and Oil and Gas Revenues, 2004
- Included in Society, 2004
- Nationalism after Communism: Lessons Learned, 2004
- Ethnic Violence and Justice: The Debate over Responsibility, Accountability, Intervention, Complicity, Tribunals and Truth Commissions, 2003
- Reinventing Media: Media Policy Reform in East Central Europe, 2003
- Reshaping Globalization: Multilateral Dialogues and New Policy Initiatives, 2003
- Society and Genetic Information: Codes and Laws in the Genetic Era, 2003
- Ethnic Monitoring and Data Protection: The European Context, 2001

== The Policy Documentation Center ==
This database of public policy documents from Central and Eastern Europe and the former Soviet Union is the largest of its kind, with over 1500 papers from over 60 institutes from over 25 countries. The PDC covers a wide range of public policy topics. The majority of papers are produced by think tanks and research institutes although the PDC also includes studies and proposals from several international programs.
