= W. Arthur Lewis =

Saint Lucian economist and Nobel laureate (1915–1991)

Sir W. Arthur Lewis
- Official Nobel Prize photo, c. 1979
- Born: William Arthur Lewis; 23 January 1915; Castries, Saint Lucia, British Windward Islands
- Died: 15 June 1991 (aged 76); Bridgetown, Saint Michael, Barbados
- Citizenship: Saint Lucian; British
- Education: London School of Economics
- Known for: Development economics; Dual-sector model; Lewis turning point; Industrial structure; History of the world economy
- Spouse: Gladys Jacobs Lewis (m. 1947)
- Children: 2 daughters
- Relatives: Allen Montgomery Lewis (brother)
- Awards: Nobel Memorial Prize in Economic Sciences (1979)
- Scientific career
- Fields: Economics
- Workplaces: London School of Economics (1938–48); University of Manchester (1948–58); University of West Indies (1959–63); Princeton University (1963–91)
- Thesis: The Economics of Loyalty Contracts (1940)
- Doctoral advisor: Sir Arnold Plant

Sir William Arthur Lewis (23 January 1915 – 15 June 1991) was a Saint Lucian economist and the James Madison Professor of Political Economy at Princeton University. Lewis remains the only black person to have won the Nobel Memorial Prize in Economic Sciences.

W. Arthur Lewis was a pioneering development economist, especially famous for his “dual-sector model” of economic development. In his 1954 paper “Economic Development with Unlimited Supplies of Labour,” he described a poor country as having two sectors: a traditional (largely agricultural) sector with surplus labor, and a modern capitalist sector. Lewis showed how surplus labor could be transferred from the traditional sector into the capitalist sector, fueling industrial growth.

== Biography ==
Arthur Lewis was born in Castries, Saint Lucia, then still part of the British Windward Islands federal colony, the fourth of the five sons of George Ferdinand and Ida Lewis (the others being Stanley, Earl, Allen and Victor). His parents had migrated from Antigua shortly after the turn of the century. George Lewis died when Arthur was seven years old and his brothers aged from five to 17, leaving Ida to raise her five children alone. Arthur was a gifted student and was promoted two classes ahead of his age. After finishing school when he was 14 years old, Lewis worked as a clerk, while waiting to be old enough to sit the examination for a government scholarship to a British university, which would be in 1932. During this time he began a lifelong friendship with Eric Williams, the future first prime minister of Trinidad and Tobago.

Lewis's initial career choice was to become an engineer, "but this seemed pointless since neither the government nor the white firms would employ a black engineer," as he later said: "Eventually I decided to study business administration, planning to return to St. Lucia for a job in the municipal service or in private trade. I would simultaneously study law to fall back on if nothing administrative turned up." At the age of 18, he earned the government scholarship to attend the London School of Economics (LSE). While enrolled to study for a Bachelor of Commerce degree ("which offered accounting, business management, commercial law and a little economics and statistics") in 1933, he would achieve similar success as he did at grade school. While at LSE, he studied under John Hicks, Arnold Plant, Lionel Robbins, and Friedrich Hayek.

After Lewis graduated in 1937 with first-class honours, LSE gave him a scholarship to read for a PhD in industrial economics, under the supervision of Arnold Plant. Lewis would become the first black faculty member at LSE: in 1938 he was given a teaching appointment, and in 1939 was made an Assistant Lecturer, continuing to work as a member of the LSE staff until 1948.

In 1947, Lewis married Gladys Jacobs, and that year he was selected as a lecturer at the Victoria University of Manchester, and moved there with his family, becoming Britain's first black lecturer. In 1948, at the age of 33, he was made a full professor. He was elected to membership of the Manchester Literary and Philosophical Society in 1948 and he taught at Manchester until 1957. During this period, he developed some of his most important concepts about the patterns of capital and wages in developing countries. He particularly became known for his contributions to development economics, of great interest as former colonies began to gain independence from their European colonizers.

Lewis served as an economic advisor to numerous African and Caribbean governments, including Nigeria, Ghana, Trinidad and Tobago, Jamaica, and Barbados. When Ghana (where in 1929 his eldest brother Stanley had settled) gained independence in 1957, Lewis was appointed as the country's first economic advisor. He helped draw up its first Five-Year Development Plan (1959–1963).

In 1959, Lewis returned to the Caribbean region when appointed Vice Chancellor of the University of the West Indies. He was elected to the American Academy of Arts and Sciences in 1962. In 1963, he was knighted by the British government for his achievements and for his contributions to economics. That year, he was also appointed Professor of Public and International Affairs at Princeton University – the first black instructor to be given a full professorship – and subsequently held the position of James Madison Professor of Political Economy. In 1966, he was elected to the American Philosophical Society. He also served from 1966 to 1973 as Chancellor of the University of Guyana. Lewis worked at Princeton for the next two decades, teaching generations of students until his retirement in 1983. Lewis helped to establish the Caribbean Development Bank and in 1970 he was selected as its first president, serving in that capacity until 1973.

Lewis received the Nobel Prize in Economics in 1979, sharing it with Theodore Schultz, "for their pioneering research into economic development research with particular consideration of the problems of developing countries".

== Personal life ==
In 1947, Lewis married Grenada-born Gladys Jacobs, with whom he had two daughters, Elizabeth and Barbara. Following his Nobel award, Lewis remained actively engaged in international economic policy until his final years. He continued to serve as an advisor to governments in Africa and the Caribbean and held a position as a professor at Princeton University until 1983, after which he became a professor emeritus. Lewis passed away on 15 June, 1991, in Bridgetown, Barbados, and was buried on the grounds of the St. Lucian community college that bears his name. His personal papers are archived at the Seeley G. Mudd Manuscript Library at Princeton University, providing a valuable resource for scholars studying the history of economic thought and development policy.

== Key works ==
=== Labour in the West Indies: The Birth of a Workers' Movement (1939) ===
Labour in the West Indies: The Birth of a Worker's Movement, first published by the Fabian Society in 1939, was an account of the 1930s labour movement in the Caribbean. It remained the only work published on the Caribbean-wide movement and the Labour Rebellions in the English-speaking Caribbean for decades. The book was republished by John La Rose and Sarah White at New Beacon Books in February 1978. Lewis is now characterised as "among the earliest proponents of Reparations for the former West Indies for Britain's colonial wrongs" because of the ideas he put forward in this work.

=== The "Lewis model" ===
Lewis published in May 1954 what was to be his most influential development economics article, "Economic Development with Unlimited Supplies of Labour" (Manchester School). In this publication, he introduced what came to be called the dual sector model, or the "Lewis model".

Lewis combined an analysis of the historical experience of developed countries with the central ideas of the classical economists to produce a broad picture of the development process. In his theory, a "capitalist" sector develops by taking labour from a non-capitalist backward "subsistence" sector. The subsistence sector is governed by informal institutions and social norms so that producers do not maximize profits and workers can be paid above their marginal product. At an early stage of development, the "unlimited" supply of labour from the subsistence economy means that the capitalist sector can expand for some time without the need to raise wages. This results in higher returns to capital, which are reinvested in capital accumulation. In turn, the increase in the capital stock leads the "capitalists" to expand employment by drawing further labour from the subsistence sector. Given the assumptions of the model (for example, that the profits are reinvested and that capital accumulation does not substitute for skilled labour in production), the process becomes self-sustaining and leads to modernization and economic development.

The point at which the excess labour in the subsistence sector is fully absorbed into the modern sector, and where further capital accumulation begins to push the balance of power towards labour (thus increasing wages) in both capitalist and subsistence sectors, is sometimes called the Lewisian turning point. It has recently been widely discussed in the context of economic development in China. Work building on Lewis's analysis has shown that productivity gains in the areas formerly occupied by the subsistence sector (e.g. agriculture) can offset some of the labour demand.

=== The Theory of Economic Growth (1955) ===
In his 1955 book, The Theory of Economic Growth, Lewis sought to "provide an appropriate framework for studying economic development", driven by a combination of "curiosity and of practical need."

During the Industrial Revolution, England was experiencing the worst economic turmoil of its time. It would not be until an economic enlightenment took place that cities began to shift towards factories and labour-intensive methods of production as they experienced giant shifts in the labour and agriculture markets, thus, eventually leading to higher production, and higher income. Lewis theorized if England could turn its misfortune around, the same could be done for developing countries around the world. His theories proved true for some countries such as Nigeria and Barbados, as they would see some economic development.

=== Politics in West Africa (1965) ===
In his 1965 book, Politics in West Africa, Lewis examines the weakness of opposition parties in West African states. He criticizes the majoritarian winner-takes-all model of politics, arguing that while it may work in European and American contexts, it cannot in the context of many African states. The reason for this is that African states are divided on linguistic and tribal lines, making it hard for peaceful co-existence between groups when one group controls the central government. Lewis argues powersharing needs to be facilitated, which he argues can be best done through proportional representation, federalism and coalition governments. Democracy can be maintained through institutional design more suited to the cleavages of African states.

=== Growth and Fluctuations, 1870–1913 (1978) ===
Lewis published Growth and Fluctuations, 1870–1913 in 1978. In it, he analyzed the global economy through the years preceding World War I. This was a time when international trade grew; railroads expanded across countries; Europeans, Indians, and Chinese left their homelands; and investment went across international boundaries. Lewis examined the changes in several major economies throughout this period.

The term fluctuation is a reference to peaks and valleys. He evaluated the changes in price levels, manufacturing output, farm output, and the availability of gold used for monetary purposes. Additionally, Lewis reviewed trends within some of the major economies and how their combined activity affected the rest of the world. Statistics are included on industrial production and the global supply of wheat.

Kari Polanyi Levitt, an economist, ties the work to Lewis' larger body of work regarding countries producing primary products for export. Lewis used economic history to examine the relationships between the global trading system and the economies of nations selling those goods internationally.

== Selected bibliography ==
- Labour in the West Indies: The Birth of a Workers' Movement (1939). Reprinted, with Afterword by Susan Craig, London: New Beacon Books, 1978.
- The Principles of Economic Planning (1949)
- The Theory of Economic Growth (1955)
- Politics in West Africa (1965). Allen and Unwin.
- Development Planning (1966)
- Tropical Development 1880–1913 (1971)
- Growth and Fluctuations 1870–1913 (1978)

== Selected awards and honours ==
- 1963: Knighthood for contributions to economics.
- 1979: Nobel Prize in Economics

== Legacy ==
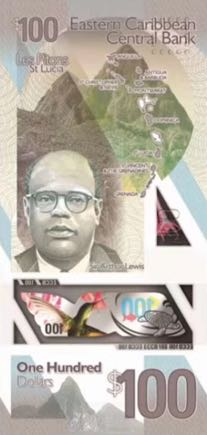
Portrait of Lewis on the East Caribbean dollar $100 bill

- The Sir Arthur Lewis Community College, St. Lucia, was named in his honour.
- The Arthur Lewis Building (opened in 2007) at the University of Manchester was named for him, as he had lectured there for several years before entering governmental positions.
- The Arthur Lewis Lectures are held annually at the University of Manchester, having begun in 2015, the centenary of his birth.
- He is commemorated by the Sir Arthur Lewis Institute of Social and Economic Studies (SALISES) on the three campuses of The University of the West Indies.
- Sir Arthur Lewis's portrait appears on the Eastern Caribbean 100-dollar bill.
- A newly titled London School of Economics building was unveiled in a ceremony attended by Sir Arthur Lewis' family, including his daughter and granddaughter, and the High Commissioner for St Lucia on Thursday 23 March 2023. Formerly known as 32 Lincoln's Inn Fields (32L), the site, now called the Sir Arthur Lewis Building (SAL), is home to various departments including the Centre for Economic Performance (CEP), the International Growth Centre (IGC), the Department of Economics, the Centre for Macroeconomics, and the Suntory and Toyota International Centres for Economics and Related Disciplines (STICERD).
- Arthur Lewis Auditorium, the main auditorium of Robertson Hall, home of the Princeton School of Public and International Affairs at Princeton University, was named after him.
- On 10 December 2020, the 41st anniversary of his receiving the Nobel Prize, Google celebrated the late Sir Arthur Lewis with a Google Doodle.

== See also ==
- Black Nobel Prize laureates
- Lewis turning point

Awards
Preceded by Herbert A. Simon	Laureate of the Nobel Memorial Prize in Economics; 1979; Served alongside: Theodore W. Schultz	Succeeded by Lawrence R. Klein
Professional and academic associations
Preceded by Sir Ralph W. Lacey	President of the Manchester Statistical Society; 1955–56	Succeeded by A. H. Allman
