= Korea International Cooperation Agency =

South Korean aid organization

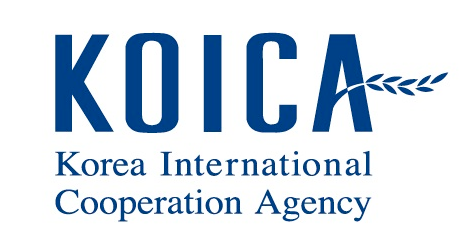

Agency overview
- Formed: April 1, 1991; 35 years ago
- Preceding agency: Korea Overseas Development Corporation
- Jurisdiction: Government of South Korea
- Headquarters: Seongnam, Gyeonggi Province, South Korea
- Employees: 379
- Agency executive: Chang Won-sam, President
- Parent agency: Ministry of Foreign Affairs
- Website: www.koica.go.kr

Korean name
- Hangul: 한국국제협력단
- Hanja: 韓國國際協力團
- RR: Hanguk gukje hyeomnyeokdan
- MR: Han'guk kukche hyŏmnyŏktan

The Korea International Cooperation Agency (KOICA; Korean: 한국국제협력단) was established in 1991 by the Ministry of Foreign Affairs of South Korea as a governmental organization for Official Development Assistance (ODA). KOICA's goal is to enhance the effectiveness of South Korea's grant aid programs for developing countries by implementing the government's grant aid and technical cooperation programs. KOICA is led by three-year-term president of the board who is appointed by the President upon the recommendation of Foreign Minister.

According to the OECD, Korea's total ODA (US$2.8 billion, preliminary data) increased in 2022 due to aid to Ukraine and an increase in humanitarian aid. It represented 0.17% of gross national income (GNI).

== Mission ==
Ambulance donated by KOICA in Dnipro, Ukraine, during war.

The Korea International Cooperation Agency was founded as a government agency on April 1, 1991, to maximize the effectiveness of South Korea's grant aid programs for developing countries by implementing the government's grant aid and technical cooperation programs. In the past, development cooperation efforts were focused mainly on meeting the basic human needs (BHNs) of developing countries and on fostering their Human Resource Development(HRD). However, the focus has now broadened to promoting sustainable development, strengthening partnerships with developing partners, and enhancing the local ownership of beneficiaries. Additionally, global concerns such as the environment, poverty reduction, and gender mainstreaming, have gained significant importance in the international community.

Due to the continuously changing trends in development assistance efforts and practices, KOICA is striving to adapt to these changes by using its limited financial resources effectively in areas where Korea has a comparative advantage. In particular, Korea has the experience of developing from one of the poorest countries in the world to one of the most economically advanced, as recently demonstrated by South Korea's entry into the OECD DAC (Development Assistance Committee) on November 25, 2009. The know-how and experience Korea gained from this transition are the assets that allow KOICA to efficiently support the sustainable socio-economic development of its partner countries.

== Timeline ==
- 1991 – Established the Korea International Cooperation Agency (KOICA)
- 1995 – Started the dispatch of international cooperation personnel (substitute military service system)
- 1996 – Joined the Organisation for Economic Co-operation and Development (OECD)
- 2008 – Moved the KOICA headquarters building
- 2009 – Launched World Friends Korea (WFK) Programs
- 2010 – Enacted the Framework Act on International Development Cooperation (Framework Act) / Joined the OECD Development Assistance Committee (DAC)
- 2011 – Hosted the fourth High Level Forum on aid effectiveness
- 2013 – Recorded more than 10,000 overseas volunteers / Launched the Global Saemaul Undong (New Village Movement)
- 2015 – Opened the History Museum of Development Cooperation

=== Presidents ===
KOICA's current and former presidents:

- since 10 July 2023: Chang Won-sam
- 30 Nov 2020 - 10 July 2023: Son Hyuk-sang
- 28 November 2017 – 30 November 2020: Lee Mi-kyung

== History ==
=== As a recipient (1945-1995) ===
In the wake of the devastating 1950 Korean War, South Korea was one of the poorest countries in the world. The war destroyed two-thirds of South Korea's national production capacity and sent unemployment rates soaring. In 1961, nearly a decade after the war's end, South Korea's per-capita GNP remained a meager $82. Its level of domestic savings was almost negligible.

During these hard and often desperate times, the Korean people could barely survive without foreign aid. Aid was provided mainly for the supply of commodities such as food, clothing, medicine, and raw materials. Foreign assistance was also used as the main source for financing the country's deficit throughout the 1950s and early 1960s. More accurately, foreign aid was virtually the only source of capital earned up until the end of the 1950s. During the reconstruction period of 1953–1960, more than 70 percent of South Korea's imports were financed by foreign aid.

Following the inception of the first Five-Year Economic Development Plan in 1962, foreign assistance began to play a more substantive role in the economic and social development of Korea. The new political leadership was strongly committed to national development and social stability and eager to induce foreign capital and assistance to fill the gap between payments the deficit, and offset the insufficiencies of domestic savings and investment.

The government launched numerous infrastructure development projects but they required huge amounts of investment. Nevertheless, the amount of grant aid was declining and the domestic savings rate was still meager. In response, the government took a substantial amount of commercial and concessional loans constructive, and new technology from abroad.

Foreign assistance in the 1960s functioned as a major source of capital and investment and as a means to improve management skills and industrial technology. Major donors during those years included the International Development Associations (IDA), the United Nations Development Programme (UNDP), the World Bank, the Asian Development Bank (ADB), and bilateral agencies such as the United States Agency for International Development (USAID) and the Overseas Economic Cooperation Fund (OECF) of Japan.

=== As a donor (1990s-present) ===
After successfully overcoming the 1997-98 financial crisis and the following economic recession, South Korea is today recognized as a post-war success story. Through properly designed development strategies and effective use of foreign assistance, South Korea has grown into the world's 11th largest economy and is a leading producer of ships, steel, automobiles, and semiconductors. In 1996, South Korea joined the Organisation for Economic Co-operation and Development (OECD).

Throughout the period of rapid economic development, there has been a considerable amount of interest in South Korea's economic performance and policies. As a result, there has been an increasing demand from the international community for South Korea's economic and technical cooperation.

The history of South Korea's donorship dates back to the mid-1960s when the South Korean government provided invitational training to technical staff from developing countries under the sponsorship of USAID. Since then, several other programs for development cooperation have been initiated, including expertise sharing in 1967, aid in kind in 1977, and feasibility studies in 1984.

Nevertheless, South Korea's independent contribution to international development is a recent phenomenon. As early as the 1980s, the South Korean government designed a program for the purpose of sharing its experiences of rapid and dynamic development based on the spirit of South-South cooperation. Many believed that South Korea's first-hand experiences could be of great help in assisting other developing countries. In 1982, the so-called International Development Exchange Program(IDEP) began to invite government officials and policymakers to participate in training courses composed of lectures, seminars, workshops, and field trips.

The government's technical cooperation programs, including the IDEP, grew in popularity among developing countries, and boosted by such a growing demand, the South Korean government sought to create a more consistent and systematic channel for development cooperation. In 1987, the South Korean government established the Economic Development Cooperation Fund (EDCF) through which concessional loans for development projects were provided to the governments of developing countries. In 1991, the Korea International Cooperation Agency (KOICA) was established to manage grant aid and technical cooperation programs.

According to the OECD, 2020 official development assistance from South Korea decreased 8.6% to US$2.2 billion.

== Schemes ==
Korea International Cooperation Agency has adopted "win-win platform for expanding the role of ODA strategic advantage", "enlarging Korean model of ODA projects reflecting South Korea's past development experience and strengths", "expanding strategic ODA and supports for developing states", "advancing KOICA's competencies", and "strengthening ODA education for 對-publics" as strategic goals to become the world's leading aid agency. Korea International Cooperation Agency is working toward building effective and efficient grant-aid structure and spreading South Korea's experience of rapid economic development to best facilitate eradicating poverty in international society.

=== Major policy directions ===
- Encouraging the Civil Society Organizations and the private sector to join KOICA's projects.
- Expanding untied aid.
- Increasing the volume of ODA and the ration of grant aid.
- Implementing a result-based management system that meets the needs of partner countries.
- Implementing South Korea's development experience and comparative advantages into develop cooperation projects.
- Maintaining the 'Selection and Focus' Principle.
- Strengthening capacity for ODA implementation.

=== World Friends Korea ===
World Friends Korea (WFK) is both the new name and the new program for volunteers dispatched overseas by the Korean government. The program is similar to the American Peace Corps program. In 2009, the South Korean government unified the separate volunteer programs previously operated by three different ministries into a single brand, "WFK", to enhance the effectiveness of the overseas volunteer programs while also offering a coherent and integrated image for Korea's overseas volunteer programs. As another two volunteer programs joined the WFK in 2010, it is a single brand name for seven different programs coordinated by KOICA. More than 20,000 WFK volunteers will be dispatched from 2009 to 2013. They will contribute to the socioeconomic development of developing countries, spreading the good image of Korea.

=== Multilateral cooperation ===
Multilateral systems provide the best prospects for an inclusive process to set the "rules for international conduct" and a forum to promote values important to Korea, including democracy, human development and social justice. To promote aid effectiveness and harmonize with the international community, KOICA is continuing to strengthen its network with multilateral organization through contributions, joint programs, joint evaluation of projects, and joint training courses. By collaborating with multilateral organizations, so called "multi-bi assistance", KOICA expects to diversify ODA delivery channels. Grant aid represents over 60% of multilateral assistance.

=== Global Disease Eradication Fund ===
As an innovative measure to draw attention on the global issues such as poverty and diseases, the government of Republic of Korea established the 'Global Disease Eradication Fund' for the purpose of eradicating infectious diseases in low income countries. Since September 2007, every international flight ticket departing from Republic of Korea has donated 1,000 won(KRW) to this fund. Global Disease Eradication Fund cooperates with International Organizations, Non-Governmental Organizations and social activists. And those are used to support infectious diseases maternal- child health projects in sub-Saharan Africa.

== Overseas Offices ==
KOICA operates 46 offices around the world. Below is a list of those country offices:

=== Asia ===
- Afghanistan - Kabul
- Bangladesh - Dhaka
- Cambodia - Phnom Penh
- Fiji - Suva
- Indonesia - Jakarta
- Laos - Vientiane
- Mongolia - Ulaanbaatar
- Myanmar - Yangon
- Nepal - Lalitpur
- Pakistan - Islamabad
- Philippines - Taguig
- Sri Lanka - Colombo
- Timor-Leste - Dili
- Vietnam - Hanoi
- Kyrgyzstan - Bishkek

=== Africa ===
- Algeria - Algiers
- Cameroon - Yaounde
- Democratic Republic of the Congo - Kinshasa
- Egypt - Cairo
- Ethiopia - Addis Ababa
- Ghana - Accra
- Ivory Coast - Abidjan
- Kenya - Nairobi
- Morocco - Rabat
- Mozambique - Maputo
- Nigeria - Abuja
- Rwanda - Kigali
- Senegal - Dakar
- Tanzania - Dar es Salaam
- Tunisia - Tunis
- Uganda - Kampala

=== Latin America ===
- Bolivia - La Paz
- Colombia - Bogotá
- Dominican Republic - Santo Domingo
- Ecuador - Quito
- El Salvador - San Salvador
- Guatemala - Guatemala City
- Paraguay - Asunción
- Peru - Lima

=== Middle East and Central Asia ===
- Azerbaijan - Baku
- Iraq - Baghdad and Erbil
- Jordan - Amman
- Kyrgyzstan - Bishkek
- Palestine - Ramallah
- Uzbekistan - Tashkent

== See also ==
- AmeriCorps
- British Romanian Educational Exchange
- CUSO
- European Voluntary Service
- Export–Import Bank of Korea which manages Economic Development Cooperation Fund
- Fredskorpset
- International Voluntary Services
- JICA (Japan International Cooperation Agency)
- National Peace Corps Association
- Peace Corps
- Provincial Reconstruction Team
- United Nations Volunteers
- United States Cultural Exchange Programs
- Voluntary Service Overseas
