= Ron Tschetter =

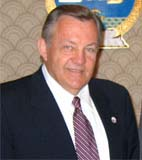
- Ron Tschetter

17th Director of the Peace Corps
- In office September 26, 2006 – August 24, 2009
- President: George W. Bush; Barack Obama
- Deputy: Jody Olsen
- Preceded by: Gaddi Vasquez
- Succeeded by: Aaron S. Williams

Personal details
- Born: October 4, 1941 (age 85) Huron, South Dakota
- Party: Republican
- Education: Bethel University
- Profession: Politician

Ronald A. Tschetter (born October 4, 1941) was the 17th Director of the Peace Corps.

== Education and Peace Corps service ==
Tschetter earned a bachelor's degree from Bethel University in psychology and social studies. After college, he and some friends traveled and hitchhiked around Europe, Syria, Lebanon, Israel and Egypt. He returned home and met and married his wife Nancy. "One day we saw this Peace Corps ad, and I said to Nancy, 'We're going to do this work stuff the rest of our lives. Let's go out and see if we can do some good,'" Tschetter says. Although the couple wanted to serve in Turkey, Iran, or Afghanistan, Tschetter and his wife were assigned to teach family-planning techniques in Maharashtra, India, beginning in 1966. "We lucked out. India was more different than any of them," says Tschetter. "Wow, what a country." Over the years the Tschetters have returned to India five times to visit their friends. Once as a Peace Corps volunteer, Tschetter traveled across India to deliver medicine to a village suffering from a smallpox epidemic. "Ultimately the village recovered," said Tschetter. "And today, smallpox is eradicated in the world and it is because of this and thousands of other experiences like it."

== Career as investment executive ==
Tschetter began his career in 1970 as both a retail and institutional investment executive with Blyth Eastman Dillon Union Securities. He joined Dain Rauscher in 1973 as a broker and spent 28 years there primarily in management before he retired. In 2004 Tschetter was named President of D.A. Davidson & Co., a full-service investment firm based in the Northwest. Tschetter served on the Securities Industry Association Sales and Marketing Committee and the New York Stock Exchange Regional Firms Advisory Committee.

== Peace Corps Director ==
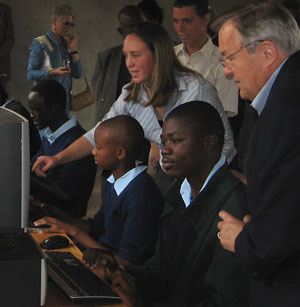
Peace Corps Director Ronald Tschetter observes deaf students on his visit to Kenya. The students are using role playing exercises, educational videos, and other visual aids that Peace Corps Volunteers have developed, including Kenya's first uniform sign language poster, the "Easy to Learn Sign Language Poster."

The White House announced Tschetter's nomination on July 25, 2006, and Tschetter was confirmed as Director of the Peace Corps by the U.S. Senate on September 13, 2006, and was sworn in on September 26, 2006, becoming the third returned Peace Corps volunteer to serve as director and the first under a Republican administration. Tschetter had previously served on the National Peace Corps Association board from 1993 to 1999, as board chairman from 1995 to 1998 and as an honorary board member from 2000 to 2003.

In an interview with Drew Houff of the Winchester Star in March 2008, Tschetter said that representing the Peace Corps is an honor. "It’s the best job in Washington — I report directly to the president," Tschetter says. "It is bipartisan, apolitical, and supported by most everyone. It also is strongly recognized as a great brand. I tell the new volunteers, ‘You are working for the gold standard of volunteerism in the Peace Corps.’"

=== Promoting the Peace Corps ===
Tschetter says that his service as a volunteer was a life changing experience and for the past 40 years he and his wife have worked to convince others to make the same commitment. "When you do and are going through it, you just don’t realize how much it is going to impact your life," says Tschetter. "Your whole value system, your insight, perceptions are impacted as such that it really changes your outlook. It changes what you do, and it changes your desire to serve." Tschetter says that he almost always accepts invitations to talk about the Peace Corps especially at universities because it helps bring new volunteers into the program and helps people understand what the Peace Corps does. "When I get an invitation from a university, it gets my attention because I just know what this can do for a young person who decides to do it," Tschetter says. "I am here to encourage the students that this is an option in your life that you ought to give serious consideration."

=== Recruitment of older volunteers ===
During his confirmation hearings Tschetter announced that he would make recruiting older volunteers a priority for the Peace Corps. "I hope to examine the agency’s recruiting process in order to broaden the applicant pool and better tap into the Baby Boom generation-- a rich harvestable field of potential Volunteers." In April, 2007, the Peace Corps announced the new "50 plus initiative." Under the initiative, older volunteers will be placed in nine test countries: Cameroon, Lesotho and South Africa, along with Ukraine, Romania, Thailand, Jamaica, Dominican Republic and Panama. As part of the program Peace Corps' recruiting messages will be focused on adults 50 and older and publicized through groups such as the AARP and the National Retired Teachers Association. Older volunteers must successfully complete the medical clearing process to serve overseas. "We can't compromise. When we send people abroad, there is no fancy hospital around the corner," says Tschetter. Medical screening, traditionally a lengthy and onerous process for older applicants, will be streamlined, and the transition time from acceptance to placement may be lengthened so older volunteers have more time to deal with personal affairs.

The Peace Corps announced a goal to boost the ranks of volunteers 50 and older from 5 percent of the 7,749 Americans in the Peace Corps to 15 percent over the next two years. "There's around 80 million baby boomers that are now starting to retire. They're healthy and they have a real service element to them," said Tschetter during a trip to Montana in May 2008. "They love to give of themselves in a variety of service ways including volunteerism." The Peace Corps reported in August, 2008 that applications from seniors had risen 50% since the campaign began in September 2007. The new campaign - called "Still Asking What You Can Do for Your Country?" is designed to appeal to baby boomers who grew up in the Kennedy years. "JFK was a role model for everyone I knew back in the early '60s," said Loyci Stockey, 64, who is beginning his service as a Peace Corps volunteer in Uganda. "He'd spoken passionately (during) my high school graduation year about some new program he was starting called the Peace Corps. I never forgot his message, and I tucked it away in the back of my head to act on someday. Today is my someday."

=== Murder of Peace Corps volunteer in the Philippines ===
After the disappearance of Peace Corps volunteer Julia Campbell in the Philippines in April, 2007, Tschetter flew to Manila to meet with Peace Corps volunteers and government officials to express his support and gather first hand information on the situation. After Campbell's body was recovered, Tschetter met with Philippine President Arroyo to thank the Philippine people and the government for their search efforts. A local citizen, Juan Donald Duntugan, was subsequently arrested for Campbell's murder, found guilty, and sentenced to life in prison in June, 2008. Tschetter visited the Philippines in September 2008 and met with President Arroyo to personally relay his gratitude for the speedy resolution of the Campbell case. "I cannot express enough my appreciation to the Philippine government for the way they handled the situation, how quickly they found the body," said Tschetter. "The incident has not affected our opinion and our presence in the Philippines. We don't see any situation at the present time that could threaten our presence in the Philippines."

=== Actions by U.S. Ambassador to Tanzania Michael Retzer ===
On June 14, 2007, the Peace Corps issued a press release announcing its strong disagreement with the decision of Michael Retzer, U.S. Ambassador to Tanzania, to withdraw the authorization for Peace Corps Country Director Christine Djondo to remain in Tanzania. "The Peace Corps has always had full confidence in Ms. Djondo as country director. Unfortunately, U.S. Ambassador Michael Retzer did not concur and has exercised his authority as chief of mission to withdraw the authorization for Ms. Djondo to remain in country." The Press Release added that the adverse effects of Retzer's decision on the Peace Corps program in Tanzania included affecting "the morale of Volunteers, new trainees, and staff" and that "because of the number of staff transitions in Tanzania, the June training class is being reduced by half to ensure adequate support for currently serving Volunteers and the new training class."

On June 27 Senator Chris Dodd put a hold on the nomination of Mark Green to replace Retzer as Ambassador citing Retzer's action as interference in the independence of the Peace Corps. Dodd asked that Retzer rescind his cable of no confidence of Djondo or that the State Department provide a written apology to her. On June 28, the State Department provided a written letter of apology to Djondo and Senator Dodd released his hold on Green's nomination allowing it to go forward.

=== Embassy incident in Bolivia ===
In July, 2007 just before a new group of thirty Peace Corps volunteers were sworn in, they received a security briefing from US Embassy Security Officer Vincent Cooper in which they were asked "to basically spy" on Cubans and Venezuelans in the country according to a report from ABC News on February 8, 2008. Peace Corps Deputy Director for Bolivia Doreen Salazar was present at the meeting and found the comments so out of line that she interrupted the briefing to clarify that volunteers did not have to follow the embassy's instructions and Salazar protested directly to the embassy. "We made it clear to the embassy that this was an inappropriate request, and they agreed." Associated Press reported that the U.S. Embassy in La Paz had issued a statement saying that "some routine information sessions about security given to certain American citizens included incorrect information. As soon as this was brought to our attention, appropriate measures were taken to assure that these errors would not be repeated." There is no indication that any Peace Corps volunteer made reports to the Embassy and Peace Corps issued a press release reiterating in no uncertain terms that the corps is not involved in any intelligence gathering.

On February 11, 2008 the Associated Press reported that Bolivian President Evo Morales had declared Cooper an "undesirable person." The U.S. embassy released a statement explaining that volunteers had mistakenly been given a security briefing meant only for embassy staff. "Nobody at the embassy has ever asked American citizens to participate in intelligence activities here," said U.S. ambassador Phillip S. Goldberg. "But I want to say that I greatly regret the incident that was made known this weekend."

=== Budget Shortfall at Peace Corps ===
On July 23, 2008 the Minneapolis Star Tribune reported that Peace Corps would be closing their Minneapolis and Denver recruitment offices at the end of the year. Tschetter said in a letter to Minnesota Congresswoman Betty McCollum that Peace Corps is facing an estimated $8.7 million shortfall in its budget for FY2008 because of the weakening dollar and that the tight budget could force the Peace Corps to reduce the number of volunteers serving worldwide by 5% or 400 volunteers.

=== Withdrawal of volunteers from Bolivia ===
On September 16, 2008, Peace Corps announced it was suspending operations in Bolivia due to "growing instability" and withdrawing all volunteers from the country. "Our first priority is the safety and security of our volunteers," said Tschetter. The withdrawal came in the aftermath of growing unrest in Bolivia after more than 30 people were killed in Pando the previous week and the expulsion of US Ambassador Philip Goldberg after accusations by the Bolivian government accusing the American government of inciting the violence. State Department Press Secretary Sean McCormack was asked during a press conference on September 16 if the withdrawal of Peace Corps volunteers has anything to do with any reduction measure and he replied that "...we have to look at the situation on the ground, and it’s our obligation to take those steps that we think are necessary to ensure that our people are able to accomplish the long-term goals of that mission. And we believe that this was a prudent step based on the situation on the ground in Bolivia." Referring to the decision to withdraw volunteers McCormack added that "Security played a big part in it."

Mac Maroglis wrote in Newsweek on September 20 that after Bolivia expelled US Ambassador Goldberg that "Washington answered by sending off the Bolivian and Venezuelan ambassadors, and even suspending Peace Corps operations." The Peace Corps issued a press release on September 22 that "while the expulsion of the U.S. Ambassador was considered by the Peace Corps, the decision to temporarily suspend the Peace Corps program in Bolivia was based on the Peace Corps emergency action plan and its evaluation process for suspensions and evacuations. The safety and security of the Volunteers and their ability to do their work are the primary factors in such a decision. In the case of Bolivia, there was increasing civil unrest, including blockading of major transportation routes, a mass protest and march planned, and escalating violence against Bolivian citizens. We made the decision to consolidate the Volunteers and then to move all 113 Volunteers based on our own evaluation."

On October 22, 2008 Associated Press published a story saying that several volunteers who had been serving in Bolivia believe that the US government overreacted with a blanket withdrawal of volunteers and that although some parts of Bolivia were unstable, most volunteers felt no security threat. "Peace Corps, unfortunately, has become another weapon in the U.S. diplomatic arsenal," said Sarah Nourse who had been serving as a volunteer in Bolivia. Thomas Shannon, the top US diplomat for Latin America, said that security had been the only reason for the pullout of Peace Corps volunteers. "We don't politicize the Peace Corps," Shannon said.

Joshua Partlow reported in the Washington Post on October 23, 2008, that when Peace Corps volunteers were being evacuated from Bolivia, volunteers were asked how many planned to return to Bolivia on their own and about half the group members raised their hands, according to participants. The article stated that more than 15 volunteers have since returned to Bolivia after leaving the Peace Corps and are working on their own to complete the projects they began as Peace Corps volunteers. "I've never felt safer in my life than I was here," said volunteer Aaron York. "I needed to be back here. . . . There was no time to say goodbye to everyone, to achieve any kind of closure, in my service, in my life here, and I really felt like I needed that." A spokesman for the Peace Corps said that the Peace Corps does not anticipate being able to return volunteers to Bolivia and reopen the program until fall of 2009 at the earliest.

=== Liberia Program Reopened after 18 years ===
On October 22, 2008 the Voice of America reported that Peace Corps is re-opening its program in Liberia which closed in 1990 due to the Liberian Civil War. "With the country enjoying a new period of peace and at the request of President Sirleaf, the Peace Corps is reestablishing a program to help rebuild Liberia's education infrastructure. And it was last year in October that the President of the United States told President Sirleaf that we would work to make that happen," said State Department Press Secretary Dana Perino. The original program in Liberia ran from 1961 to 1990 and over 4,400 volunteers served in Liberia during that period. Liberian President Ellen Johnson Sirleaf had requested that the Peace Corps re-establish its program. Peace Corps volunteers will work in teacher training programs, libraries, high schools, parent-teacher associations, and health care.

=== Proposal for Peace Corps Foundation ===
On October 23, 2008 Tschetter proposed the creation of a Peace Corps Foundation as a private charitable non-profit corporation "to advance the Peace Corps' third goal of inspiring a better understanding of other cultures through returned Volunteers in America" and "to increase public awareness within the United States of Peace Corps Volunteer experiences, and the diversity of the countries in which they serve." Tschetter proposed that the foundation not be a federal agency but that funding would be sought from corporations, foundations, and private individuals while grants would be provided for programs approved by a governing board. Tschetter proposed that the foundation have a building in Washington, DC that would serve as an education facility "where Americans, particularly children, would come and learn more about other cultures and countries, as well as how the Peace Corps fulfills its mission of promoting peace and friendship worldwide."

== See also ==
- Peace Corps

== Citations ==
Government offices
Preceded by Gaddi Vasquez	Director of the Peace Corps; 2006–2009	Succeeded by Aaron S. Williams
