= Norec =

Norwegian governmental and volunteering body

Norec (from English Norwegian Agency for Exchange Cooperation) is a Norwegian governmental body financing two-way mutual personnel exchange between companies and organisations in Norway and similar companies and organisations in the global South – that is countries in Africa, Asia and Latin America. Previous to 2018, the organisation was named FK Norway.

Norec was founded as Fredskorpset (meaning the Peace Corps in Norwegian) in 1963, based on ideas of John F. Kennedy's American Peace Corps. It was relaunched in 2000 to promote mutual international exchange of young people.

Norec is an administrative body, reporting to the Norwegian Ministry of Foreign Affairs. It funds exchange programmes between various colleges, organisations, businesses etc. in the southern and northern hemispheres.

By 2018, more than 9000 participants had been posted abroad for an average period of one year. FK Norway has regional networks in Asia, Africa, Latin America and Norway.

Tor Elden was secretary general and later director of FK Norway in the period 2000–2008. He was succeeded by Nita Kapoor, who was the director from 2009 to 2018. Jan Olav Baarøy has served as the Director General since 2018.

Until 2018, the head office was located in Oslo. That year it was moved to Førde as part of the national government's decentralisation policy.

== See also ==
- Peace Corps
- CUSO
- AmeriCorps
- British Romanian Educational Exchange
- European Voluntary Service
- International Voluntary Services
- JICA (Japan International Cooperation Agency)
- Korea International Cooperation Agency
- National Peace Corps Association
- Provincial Reconstruction Team
- United Nations Volunteers
- United States Cultural Exchange Programs
- Voluntary Service Overseas
