= John Dellenback =

American politician (1918–2002)

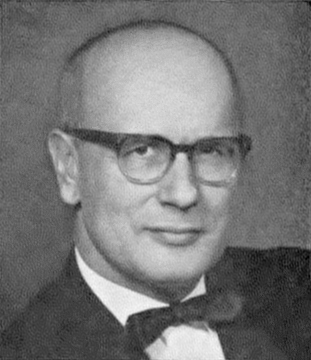

7th Director of the Peace Corps
- In office April 25, 1975 – May 13, 1977
- President: Gerald Ford; Jimmy Carter
- Preceded by: Nicholas Craw
- Succeeded by: Carolyn R. Payton

Member of the U.S. House of Representatives from Oregon's 4th district
- In office January 3, 1967 – January 3, 1975
- Preceded by: Robert B. Duncan
- Succeeded by: James H. Weaver

Member of the Oregon House of Representatives
- In office 1960–1966

Personal details
- Born: November 6, 1918 Chicago, Illinois, U.S.
- Died: December 7, 2002 (aged 84) Medford, Oregon, U.S.
- Party: Republican
- Spouse: Mary Jane Dellenback
- Education: Yale University; University of Michigan

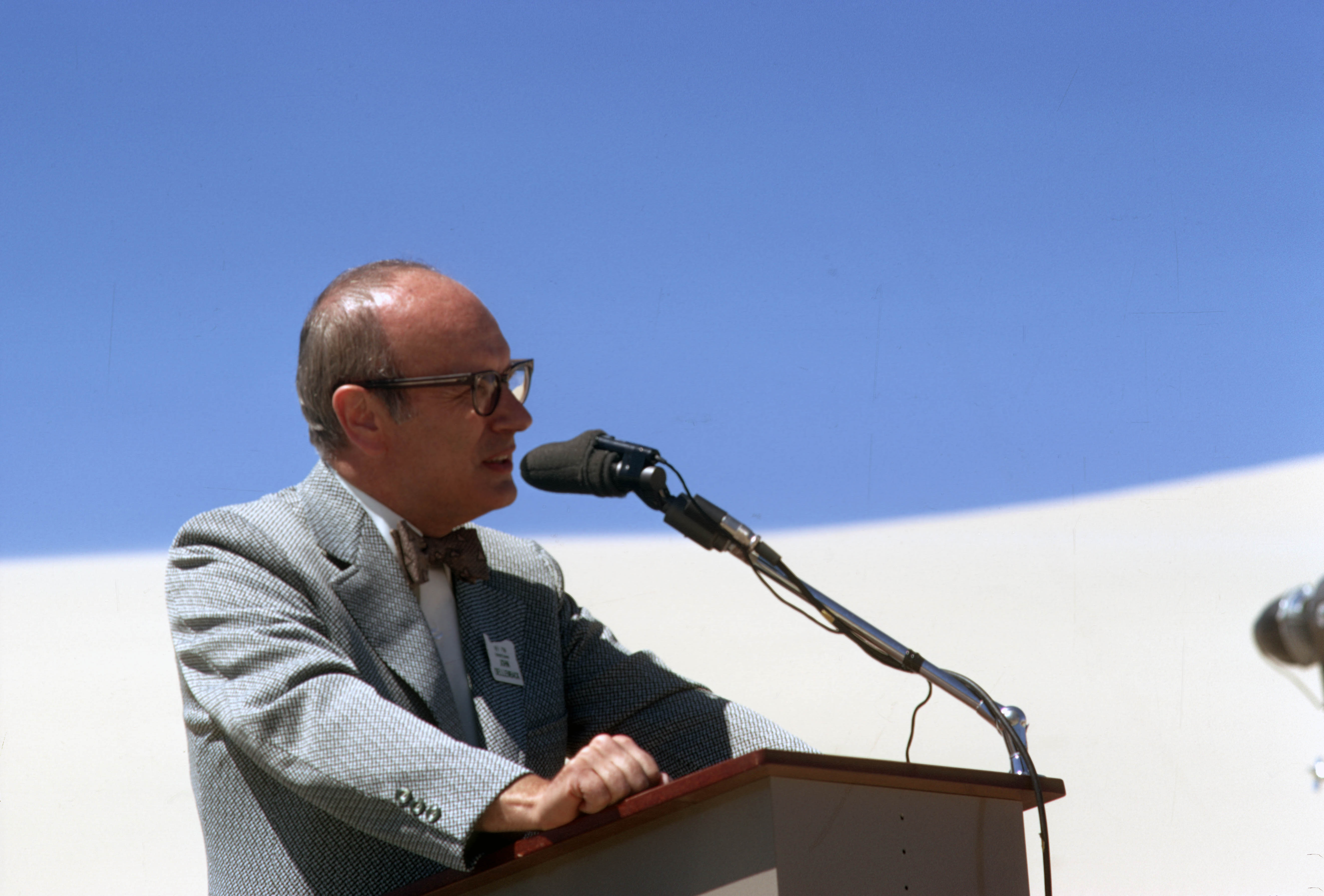
Dellenback speaking in 1972

John Richard Dellenback (November 6, 1918 – December 7, 2002) was a Republican U.S. congressman from Oregon.

Born in Chicago, Illinois, Dellenback's maternal grandparents were Norwegian and his paternal grandparents were each from Alsace-Lorraine and Germany. After graduating from Yale University, he served in the United States Navy during World War II, then received his law degree from the University of Michigan in 1949 and began teaching law at Oregon State College (later Oregon State University) that same year.

In 1960, Dellenback was elected to the Oregon House of Representatives, and in 1966, was elected to the United States House of Representatives, representing Oregon's 4th congressional district. While in Congress, Dellenback, a Republican, earned a reputation as an independent thinker. He wrote legislation to establish the Oregon Dunes National Recreation Area, worked to pass a bill that made pipeline permit-holders and shippers liable for oil spills, and supported federal Title IX legislation for equal opportunity for boys and girls in athletics. Dellenback voted in favor of the Civil Rights Act of 1968, and in 1971, he voted in favor of the Equal Employment Opportunity Act.

Dellenback served four terms in the House and was defeated in the 1974 elections by liberal Democrat Jim Weaver. Dellenback's defeat is largely attributed to the anti-Republican mood of the electorate in the wake of the Watergate scandal.

After leaving Congress, Dellenback was appointed by President Gerald Ford as director of the Peace Corps, where he served from 1975 to 1977. From 1977 to 1988, Dellenback was president of the Christian College Coalition (now called the Council for Christian Colleges & Universities. In this capacity he was appointed in 1985 by George P. Shultz to a panel evaluating the Reagan administration's policy toward apartheid South Africa; he was one of three dissenting voices that called increased pressure on the apartheid government "wasteful and counterproductive".

Dellenback died in Medford, Oregon of viral pneumonia in 2002.

To date, he is the last Republican to serve as representative from Oregon's 4th congressional district.

U.S. House of Representatives
Preceded by Robert B. Duncan	Member of the U.S. House of Representatives from Oregon's 4th congressional district 1967–1975	Succeeded by James H. Weaver
Government offices
Preceded by Nicholas Craw	Director of the Peace Corps; 1975–1977	Succeeded by Carolyn R. Payton
