= Jim Weaver (Oregon politician) =

American politician (1927–2020)

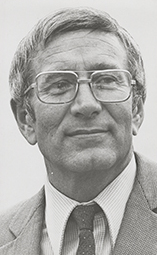
- Official portrait, 1975

Member of the U.S. House of Representatives from Oregon's 4th district
- In office January 3, 1975 – January 3, 1987
- Preceded by: John Dellenback
- Succeeded by: Peter DeFazio

Personal details
- Born: James Howard Weaver; August 8, 1927 Brookings, South Dakota, U.S.
- Died: October 6, 2020 (aged 93) Eugene, Oregon, U.S.
- Party: Democratic
- Education: University of Oregon (BS)

Military service
- Branch/service: United States Navy
- Battles/wars: World War II

James Howard Weaver (August 8, 1927 – October 6, 2020) was an American businessman, politician, and World War II veteran from the U.S. state of Oregon. A member of the Democratic Party, he served as member of the United States House of Representatives for six terms representing Oregon's 4th congressional district from 1975 to 1987.

He was known as an advocate for environmental protections, especially those relating to Oregon and the Pacific Northwest region.

== Early life and education ==
Weaver was born in Brookings, South Dakota, the son of Leo C. and Alice (Flittie) Weaver. He enlisted in the United States Navy at the age of seventeen and served in World War II on an aircraft carrier in the Pacific. Weaver moved to Oregon from Des Moines, Iowa, in 1947 to attend the University of Oregon. He graduated with a Bachelor of Science degree in 1952.

== Career ==
Prior to entering Congress, Weaver worked for a publishing company. In 1959, he was hired as a staff member for the Oregon Department of Agriculture. In 1960, Weaver was hired by a real estate development company, eventually becoming a developer of apartment and office buildings. He was a delegate to the 1960 and 1964 Democratic National Conventions.

In 1974, Weaver defeated incumbent Republican congressman John Dellenback to become member of the United States House of Representatives from Oregon's 4th congressional district. He was known for conducting the only filibuster in the modern history of the House of Representatives by adding 113 amendments to the Energy Northwest bill in 1980. After the filibuster, the House passed "The Weaver Rule" to "limit" the use of such tactics.

In 1986, Weaver was selected as the Democratic nominee for United States Senate and was to face incumbent Republican Bob Packwood. After receiving the nomination, however, Weaver was the subject of a United States House Committee on Ethics probe into his campaign finances, and withdrew his candidacy when it became apparent that he would lose the general election. Oregon State Representative Rick Bauman was selected to replace Weaver on the ballot, and lost to Packwood. The House Ethics Committee ruled that Weaver had used campaign money for personal investments, in violation of House rules. Eventually it was discovered that the report had included errors. The House Ethics Committee later stated that Weaver had not violated the law. Weaver served out his term and was succeeded by his aide, Peter DeFazio.

== Death and legacy ==
In 2008, a trail around Oregon's Waldo Lake was renamed as the "Jim Weaver Loop Trail" in honor of Weaver.

Weaver died in Eugene on October 6, 2020, at the age of 93.

U.S. House of Representatives
Preceded by John Dellenback	Member of the U.S. House of Representatives from Oregon's 4th congressional district 1975–1987	Succeeded by Peter DeFazio
Party political offices
Preceded by Ted Kulongoski	Democratic nominee for U.S. Senator from Oregon (Class 3); 1986	Succeeded by Rick Bauman
