= Mark L. Schneider =

15th director of the Peace Corps (1999–2001)

Mark Schneider
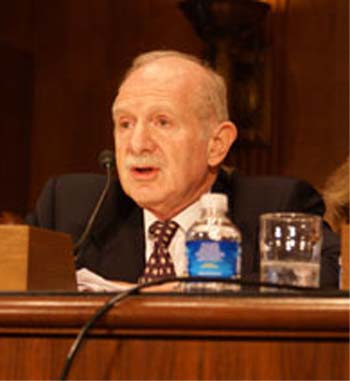

15th Director of the Peace Corps
- In office December 23, 1999 – January 20, 2001
- President: Bill Clinton
- Preceded by: Mark D. Gearan
- Succeeded by: Gaddi Vasquez

Personal details
- Born: Mark Lewis Schneider; 1941 (age 84–85)
- Education: University of California, Berkeley (BA); San Jose State University (MA)

Mark Lewis Schneider (born 1941) served as the 15th director of the Peace Corps (1999–2001).

== Education and Peace Corps Service ==
Schneider grew up in Antioch, California, where he attended Antioch High School and was class salutatorian. Schneider attended U.C. Berkeley on a four-year scholarship and graduated in 1963 majoring in journalism.

Schneider joined the Peace Corps and served in El Salvador with his wife, Susan, then married for one year, where they helped build a bridge across a ravine and introduced a school milk program. As Peace Corps Director Schneider revisited his old site on an official visit to El Salvador in March, 1999. The bridge Schneider helped build is still standing and has been named after him.

Schneider called his Peace Corps service "the most illuminating, rewarding and exhausting period of my life. I saw the constant struggle to survive in the developing world -- children without enough to eat, mothers without access to health care, fathers unable to find work to earn the income to care for their families." Returning from the Peace Corps, Schneider earned a Master's degree in political science from San Jose State.

== Government service ==
Schneider was a member of Senator Edward Kennedy's staff from 1970 to 1977. From 1977 to 1979, Schneider served as a senior policy adviser to the director of the Pan American Health Organization then senior deputy assistant secretary for human rights at the Department of State. During the Clinton Administration Schneider was appointed assistant administrator for Latin America at the U.S. Agency for International Development in November 1993 directing U.S. foreign assistance programs in this hemisphere, supporting democracy, social and economic development and environmental protection.

== Peace Corps director ==
President Clinton named Schneider as Director of the Peace Corps in a recess appointment on December 23, 1999. "I want to express my gratitude and sincerest appreciation to President Clinton for the trust he has shown in appointing me to be the Director of the Peace Corps," Schneider said. "As a former Peace Corps volunteer in El Salvador from 1966-68, this appointment constitutes the highest honor I can imagine receiving." "The opportunity to follow so many distinguished men and women who preceded me as Peace Corps Director also carries a certain degree of humility. From the Honorable R. Sargent Shriver to Loret Ruppe and Senator Paul Coverdell to Carol Bellamy and my immediate predecessor, Mark Gearan, there is an enormous legacy to which I pledge to contribute to the best of my ability," Schneider added.

Schneider was the second returned Volunteer (El Salvador, 1966–1968) to head the agency and the first practicing Jew to head the agency. Schneider credits his parents and their Jewish values with motivating him to join the Peace Corps. "I actually do think that the ethics and values that come out of my religious background are reflected in what the Peace Corps does and what the Peace Corps is," Schneider said.

=== Digital Peace Corps ===
Schneider launched an initiative at a Peace Corps Day ceremony at the John F. Kennedy Library on March 7, 1999, to increase Volunteers' participation in helping prevent the spread of HIV/AIDS in Africa, and also sought Volunteers to work on information technology projects to enhance development of overseas communities. "This technology will, in my view, simply give volunteers the green light to innovate, in bridging the digital divide, while remaining true to the core mission that President Kennedy set out for the Peace Corps – to help the people of the developing world help themselves," Schneider said.

== International Crisis Group ==
Schneider is a senior vice-president of the International Crisis Group. In this role he has testified before Congress and written op-ed pieces for The Washington Times, The Boston Globe, and the International Herald Tribune on the political situation in Afghanistan, Haiti, Venezuela, Bolivia, and Pakistan.

=== Expansion of the Peace Corps ===
On July 25, 2007, Schneider testified before Senator Chris Dodd's Senate Subcommittee in support of the Peace Corps Volunteer Empowerment Act and said he was convinced the new legislation contained three critical elements that would enable the Peace Corps to double in size to 15,000 Volunteers by the time it celebrates its 50th anniversary on 1 March 2011. "Those elements are first, authorizing the necessary funds; second, empowering Volunteers which will mean better management, improved programming and site selection, safer and more satisfied Volunteers and third, removal of financial, medical, and bureaucratic obstacles to recruiting senior Volunteers," said Schneider.

=== Situation in Pakistan ===
In an Op-ed piece in the August 15, 2007 issue of the Boston Globe, "Getting answers on Pakistan," Schneider argued that time is running out on the military dictatorship in Pakistan and that the United States can either support a return to democracy or sit on the sidelines and watch Pakistan slide in chaos. "If Bhutto and Sharif are not allowed to participate in October's election, their mainstream moderate parties will be further alienated, leaving the political field open to Islamist forces," said Schneider. "The Pakistani people have registered their desire for a democratic transition with street protests, which have been met by guns and gas. This increasingly vocal opposition, spearheaded by the bar associations, human rights groups, and the media, is channeling public resentment to military rule," Schneider added.

== Other activities ==
On November 29, 2007 the State Department announced that Schneider had joined the Democracy Network, a network of former government officials, academics and members of nongovernmental organizations created to help Latin American and Caribbean nations deal with issues related to promoting and defending democracy in the region. The network will advise governments issues like electoral and constitutional reform, access to justice, good governance, citizen participation, transparency and efforts to combat corruption.

== Honors ==
Schneider was the recipient of the Bernardo O'Higgins Medal for human rights work from the Government of Chile.

Schneider was a Woodrow Wilson Visiting Fellowship at Reed College.

Schneider received a Congressional Fellowship from the American Political Science Association.

Schneider received the Marshall Scholarship.

== Citations ==
Government offices
Preceded by Mark D. Gearan	Director of the Peace Corps; 1999–2001	Succeeded by Gaddi Vasquez
