= Export–Import Bank of Korea =

Bank in South Korea

- Company type: State-owned enterprise
- Industry: Banking; Financial services
- Founded: 1976; 50 years ago
- Headquarters: Seoul, South Korea
- Key people: Kiyeon Hwang, Chairman & CEO
- Products: Investment Banking; Commercial Banking
- Parent: Ministry of Economy and Finance
- Website: Official Website

The Export–Import Bank of Korea (Korean: 한국수출입은행), also commonly known as the Korea Eximbank (KEXIM), is the official export credit agency of South Korea.

== Overview ==
The bank was first established in 1976. Its primary purpose is to support South Korea's export-led economy by providing loans, financing mega projects and thereby facilitating economic cooperation with other countries.

== Government funds ==
The bank manages the following government funds:

- Economic Development Cooperation Fund (EDCF): The EDCF evaluates and implements aid projects in developing countries.
- Inter-Korean Cooperation Fund (IKCF): The IKCF oversees an economic cooperation program with North Korea and serves as a clearing settlement bank with the Foreign Trade Bank of North Korea.

== Aid programs ==
On January 6, 2013, the bank announced its decision to provide loans and credit guarantees worth US$917 million to entertainment and food firms over the next three years to promote the spread of the Korean Wave in foreign countries. A spokesman representing the bank told reporters that K-pop, Korean dramas, as well as traditional Korean cuisine have huge growth potential, and that exporters of such cultural content deserve more investment and financial support.

== See also ==
- List of banks in South Korea
