= Rick Bauman =

American politician (born 1950)

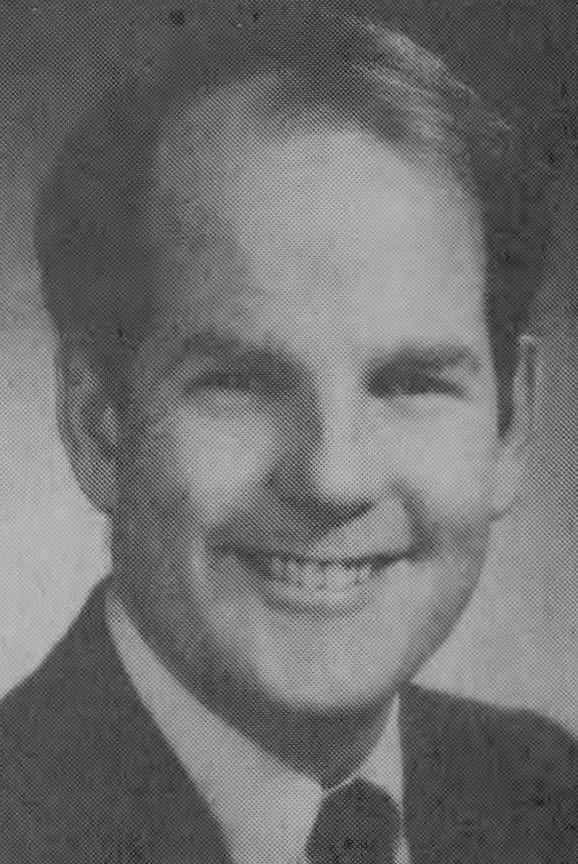

Member of the Oregon House of Representatives from the 11th/13th district
- In office 1977–1986
- Preceded by: Earl Blumenauer
- Succeeded by: Judy Bauman

Personal details
- Born: April 1950 (age 76) Marinette, Wisconsin, U.S.
- Party: Democratic
- Spouse: Ginnie Cooper
- Profession: Bicycle events manager

Richard H. "Rick" Bauman (born April 1950) is a former American Democratic politician from the US state of Oregon who served in the Oregon House of Representatives and on the Multnomah County Board of Commissioners in the 1980s. He was also the Democratic nominee for United States Senator from Oregon in 1986. After retiring from politics in 1992, Bauman began organizing bicycle tours and was a founder of Portland Bridge Pedal, an annual bicycle tour crossing all the bridges in Portland.

== Early life and career ==
Bauman was born in 1950 in Marinette, Wisconsin and is the grandson of Harvey V. Higley, who served as Veteran's Administration director under President Dwight D. Eisenhower. Bauman moved with his family to Santa Clara, California where he graduated from high school, and then enrolled at UC Santa Cruz where he received a bachelor's degree in anthropology. Bauman spent a year in India setting up a public health program before relocating to Portland, Oregon, where he transferred to Portland State University and earned another bachelor's degree, this time in biology. Now married to Judy, who was attending law school, Bauman drove taxis and worked as a home remodeler while helping raise the couple's two daughters. Bauman applied to Oregon Health Sciences University with hopes of becoming a doctor, but was not admitted.

== Political career ==
Having been energized by liberal Democratic politics while at UC Santa Cruz, Bauman worked on Jerry Brown's 1976 Presidential campaign. In 1978, Bauman was elected to the Oregon House of Representatives, representing District 11 in Portland. He was re-elected three times (his district was renumbered to District 13 in 1983) and was elected speaker pro tempore twice. An outspoken progressive and opponent of nuclear power, Bauman demonstrated for the closing of the Trojan Nuclear Power Plant in 1979.

In 1979, Bauman announced a run for the United States House of Representatives for Oregon's 3rd congressional district, but later withdrew and sought re-election to the Oregon House. In 1981, he ran unsuccessfully for the Portland school board, and in 1983, announced his intention to run for Portland mayor, but again withdrew and ran again for his Oregon House seat.

In 1986, Bauman resigned his seat in favor of his wife to run for the Democratic nomination in the 1986 U.S. Senate election in Oregon. To draw attention to his candidacy, he hiked across the state from California to Washington, but came in third in a race won by U.S. Congressman Jim Weaver. However, after the primaries, a House Ethics Committee probe into Weaver's campaign finances led him to withdraw his candidacy and the Oregon Democratic State Central Committee selected Bauman to replace Weaver on the ballot in August, just 10 weeks before the general election against three-term incumbent Bob Packwood. Packwood went on to defeat Bauman 63%–36%.

Following his loss in the Senate race, Bauman began working with the poor and homeless in Portland, organizing vigils and protests to draw attention to their plight. In 1987, he staged a solid-food fast to urge the Oregon Legislature to increase funding for social services, ending it when Oregon Governor Neil Goldschmidt proposed funding increases. Bauman became vice chairman of the Burnside Community Council, a service center for homeless adults in Portland, but later resigned in protest after the council voted to keep secret a report detailing allegations of sexual misconduct against the founder of the council; Bauman opposed the decision.

Bauman was elected to the Multnomah County Board of Commissioners in 1988. In 1990, Bauman was the target of a recall campaign after he wrote a controversial gun control law, but survived the recall. Two years later, he was defeated for re-election to the commission board by Tanya Collier.

== Bicycle tours ==
Following his loss, Bauman announced that he was finished with politics and began organizing bicycle tours. In 1994, he organized Cycle Vietnam, the first large-scale American bicycle tour of that country. In 1996, Bauman created Portland Bridge Pedal, a bicycle tour with a route over all 10 Portland bridges that cross the Willamette River. Bauman said he was inspired to organize such an event after he had a view of the 1980 eruption of Mount St. Helens from the Marquam Bridge in his car and thought bicyclists should have a chance to enjoy the views normally available only to drivers. The first event drew 7,500 riders; Providence Health & Services began sponsoring the event a year later and renamed it the Providence Bridge Pedal. By 2007, the tour was the third-largest of the largest organized cycle tours in the world, behind New York City's Five Boro Bike Tour and Montreal's Tour de l'Île. Bauman is still involved with the event.

== Personal ==
Bauman divorced Judy Bauman in 1987, and has since remarried twice. He is currently married to Ginnie Cooper, formerly the head librarian of the Multnomah County Library system, and now the chief librarian of the District of Columbia Public Library system.

Party political offices
Preceded by Jim Weaver	Democratic nominee for U.S. Senator from Oregon (Class 3); 1986	Succeeded by Les AuCoin
