= Nita Kapoor =

Norwegian cultural director (born 1956)

Nita Kapoor (born 24 November 1956) is a Norwegian cultural director. She has worked extensively with culture, media and communications as well as immigrants' issues in Norway and women's issues globally.

She migrated to Norway from India in 1967. She has cand.mag. education from the University of Oslo (1979) and business administration from the BI School of Management (1987).

During the Labour Jagland's Cabinet, she was appointed political advisor in the Ministry of Culture. From 1998 to 2000 she was the information director of Norwegian State Railways. In 2004 she took over as the new cultural director of the Norwegian Broadcasting Corporation, succeeding Turid Birkeland, the former Minister of Culture to whom Kapoor was political advisor. Nita Kapoor was promoted to new director for the Norwegian Peace Corps in May 2009.

She has been a board member of MiRA Senteret and Antirasistisk Senter (1979–1993), SOS Rasisme (1986–1989), Save the Children Norway (2001–2003) and Oslo University College (2003–2007); and a member of the Norway's Contact Committee for Immigrants and the Authorities (1990–1992) and the Broadcasting Council (1998–2003). She has written several books.
