= 1986 United States Senate election in Oregon =

- November 8, 1986
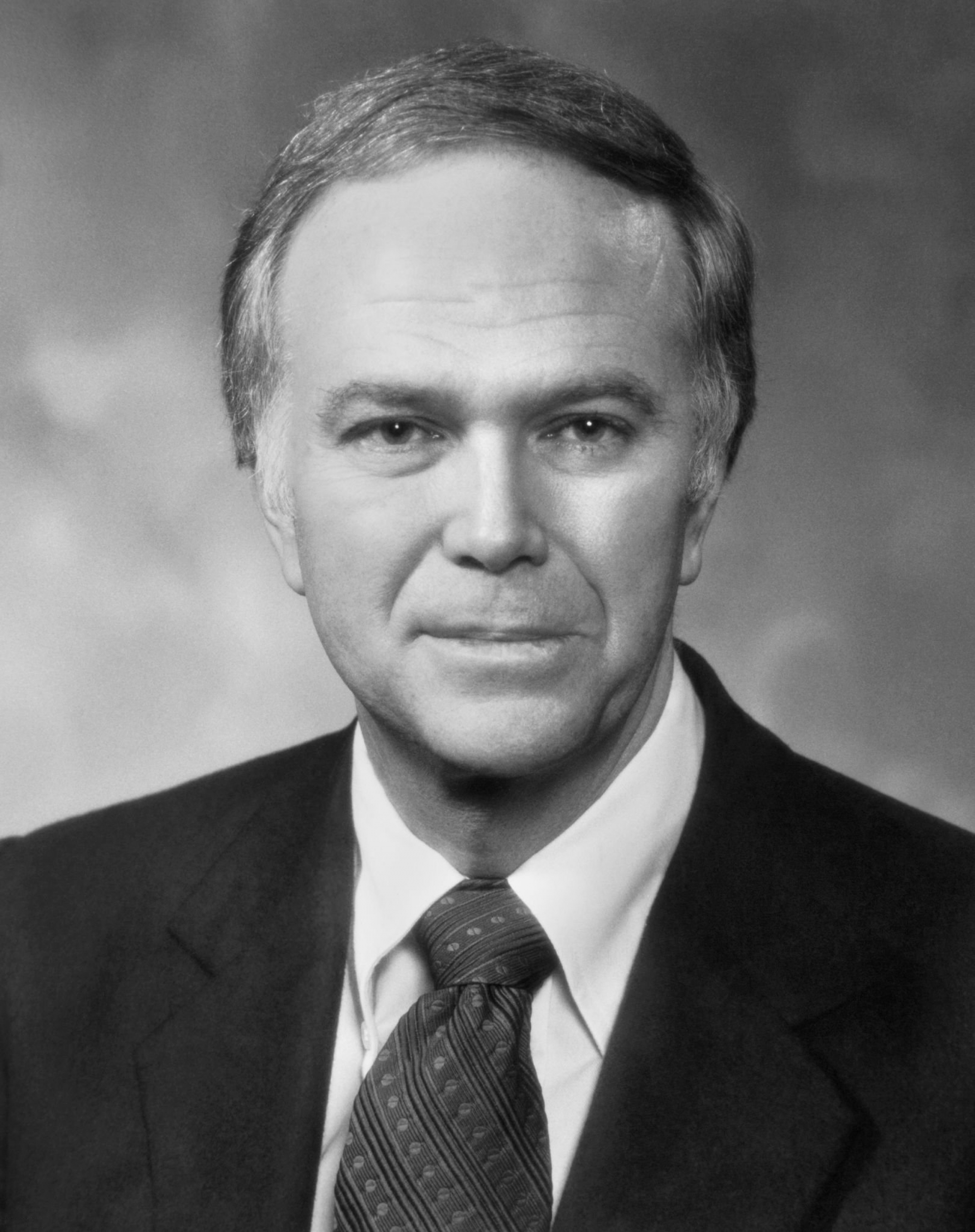

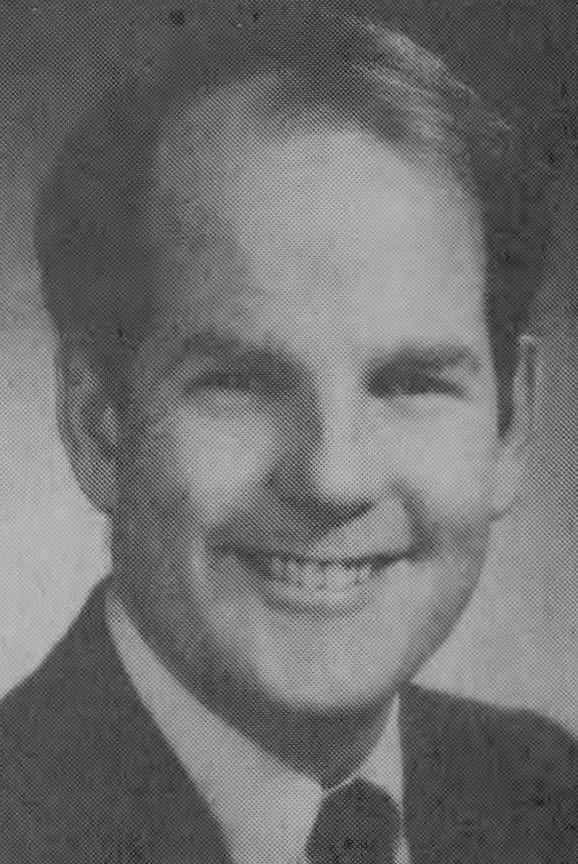
| Nominee | Bob Packwood | Rick Bauman (replacing Jim Weaver) |
| Party | Republican | Democratic |
| Popular vote | 656,317 | 375,735 |
| Percentage | 62.95% | 36.04% |
- County results Packwood: 40–50% 50–60% 60–70% 70–80% Bauman: 50–60% 70–80%
U.S. senator before election
Bob Packwood
Republican
Elected U.S. Senator
Bob Packwood
Republican

The 1986 United States Senate election in Oregon was held on November 8, 1986. Incumbent Republican Bob Packwood ran for re-election. U.S. Congressman Jim Weaver received the Democratic nomination. A populist Democratic congressman from Eugene, Oregon, he was a darling of the environmentalists. Weaver supported the Oregon Wilderness Act of 1984. Packwood was confident, despite the popular opponent, because he had more money and a better campaign organization. After winning the party nomination, Weaver was the subject of a House Ethics Committee probe into his campaign finances, and withdrew his candidacy. Rick Bauman was selected to replace Weaver on the ballot, and lost handily to Packwood.

== Democratic primary ==
=== Candidates ===
==== Declared ====
- Rick Bauman, State Representative
- Rod Monroe, State Senator

==== Withdrew ====
- Jim Weaver, U.S. Representative

=== Results ===
Democratic primary for the United States Senate from Oregon, 1986
| Party | Candidate | Votes | % |
|---|---|---|---|
| Democratic | Jim Weaver | 183,334 | 61.56% |
| Democratic | Rod Monroe | 44,553 | 14.96% |
| Democratic | Rick Bauman | 41,939 | 14.08% |
| Democratic | Steve Anderson | 26,130 | 8.77% |
| Democratic | miscellaneous | 1,868 | 0.63% |
| Total votes | | 297,824 | 100.00% |

After the primary, a House Ethics Committee probe into Weaver's campaign finances led him to withdraw his candidacy and the Oregon Democratic State Central Committee selected Bauman to replace Weaver on the ballot in August, just 10 weeks before the general election.

== Republican primary ==
=== Candidates ===
- Joe Lutz, Baptist minister and evangelical/conservative activist
- Bob Packwood, incumbent U.S. Senator

=== Results ===
Republican Primary results by county: Packwood: 50–60%; 60–70%; Lutz: 50–60%; 60–70%; 80–90%

Republican primary for the United States Senate from Oregon, 1986
| Party | Candidate | Votes | % |
|---|---|---|---|
| Republican | Bob Packwood (incumbent) | 171,985 | 57.62% |
| Republican | Joe Lutz | 126,315 | 42.32% |
| Republican | miscellaneous | 166 | 0.06% |
| Total votes | | 298,466 | 100.00% |

== General election ==
=== Candidates ===
- Rick Bauman, State Representative
- Bob Packwood, incumbent U.S. Senator

=== Results ===
United States Senate election in Oregon, 1986
| Party | Candidate | Votes | % |
|---|---|---|---|
| Republican | Bob Packwood (incumbent) | 656,317 | 62.95% |
| Democratic | Rick Bauman | 375,735 | 36.04% |
| Independent | Write-in | 10,503 | 1.01% |
| Total votes | | 1,042,555 | 100.00% |
| Republican hold | | | |

== See also ==
- 1986 United States Senate elections
