= Gaddi Vasquez =

American diplomat (born 1955)

Gaddi H. Vasquez
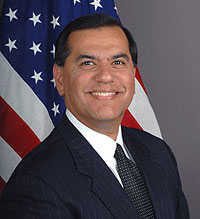

8th United States Ambassador to the United Nations Agencies for Food and Agriculture
- In office September 7, 2006 – January 17, 2009
- President: George W. Bush
- Preceded by: Tony P. Hall
- Succeeded by: Ertharin Cousin

16th Director of the Peace Corps
- In office February 15, 2002 – September 7, 2006
- President: George W. Bush
- Preceded by: Mark L. Schneider
- Succeeded by: Ron Tschetter

Chair of the Orange County Board of Supervisors
- In office January 7, 1995 – October 12, 1995
- Preceded by: Thomas F. Riley
- Succeeded by: Roger R. Stanton
- In office January 15, 1991 – January 7, 1992
- Preceded by: Don Roth
- Succeeded by: Roger R. Stanton

Vice Chair of the Orange County Board of Supervisors
- In office January 8, 1995 – October 12, 1995
- Preceded by: Thomas F. Riley
- Succeeded by: Roger R. Stanton
- In office January 9, 1990 – January 15, 1991
- Preceded by: Don Roth
- Succeeded by: Roger R. Stanton

Member of the Orange County Board of Supervisors from the 3rd District
- In office April 10, 1987 – September 27, 1995
- Preceded by: Bruce Nestande
- Succeeded by: Donald Saltarelli

Personal details
- Born: January 22, 1955 (age 71) Carrizo Springs, Texas
- Party: Republican
- Profession: Law enforcement Government; Corporate Executive

Gaddi Holguin Vasquez (born January 22, 1955) was the 8th United States Ambassador to the United Nations Agencies for Food and Agriculture, in Rome, Italy. He was nominated by President George W. Bush and unanimously confirmed by the United States Senate on June 29, 2006. Vasquez was sworn into office on September 7, 2006, by U.S. Secretary of State Condoleezza Rice, and served in the position until 2009. Prior to that, he was the first person of Hispanic ancestry to head the Peace Corps.

== Early life and education ==
Born in Carrizo Springs, Texas, Vasquez is a Mexican-American and the son of migrant workers. Vasquez grew up in poverty. He kept a photo of him and his father on his desk at the Peace Corps. "I have this here as a reminder every day," said Vasquez. "I lived in Third World conditions without having to go overseas." Vasquez's family lived in a trailer in Watsonville, California, and worked as migrant workers until Vasquez went to first grade. "I remember that when I was very young, people who were homeless - they were called hobos then - would come up and bang on the door and literally ask for a meal. My mother would tell them to wait on the porch or wait outside and she would cook them a burrito, notwithstanding our own limitations. I watched this over and over again," he said, so much so that it became known, "If you needed a meal, go down to the Vasquez house." The family moved to Orange County, California, where his father went to work in a furniture factory in Los Angeles and eventually to the Apostolic Church in Orange, where he served as Pastor until his passing. Vasquez went to Orange High School in Orange, to Santa Ana College and then on to the University of Redlands. "I was the first one to graduate college," Vasquez said.

Vasquez has been awarded five honorary doctorate degrees and has served as a Trustee/Professor at Chapman University, Orange, California. He has served as commencement speaker at Chapman University, Vanguard University, University of Wisconsin at Madison, James Madison University, University of La Verne, University of San Diego, California State University, Fullerton, California State University San Marcos, Walsh University, Houghton College, University of Redlands, Concordia University, Irvine and Chaminade University in Hawaii.

== Orange County official ==
Vasquez worked in the public sector for 22 years before his Peace Corps nomination, starting as a police officer for the city of Orange, California. He later worked as deputy appointments secretary for Governor George Deukmejian, followed by service as Chairman of the Orange County Board of Supervisors. Vasquez resigned this position in 1995 after the county's bankruptcy. The Orange County bankruptcy changed the course of his political ambitions, eventually leading Vasquez to reach out to his Republican colleagues for help in re-creating his career.

In 1988 Vasquez addressed the Republican national convention and said that Hispanics shouldn't support Democratic nominee Michael Dukakis for President just because Dukakis spoke Spanish. The Democratic nominee spoke Spanish, Vasquez said, but because of his liberal policies, "he doesn't speak our language."

== Peace Corps Director ==
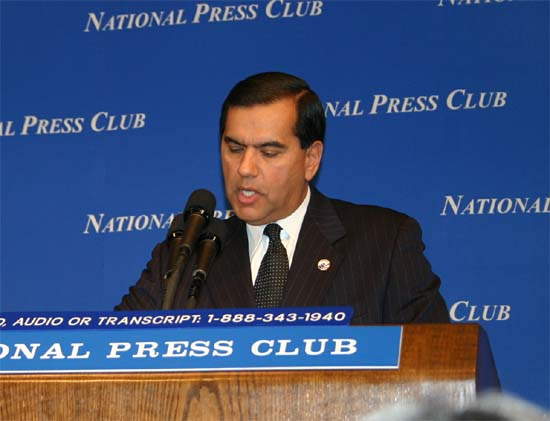
Peace Corps Director Gaddi Vasquez addresses the National Press Club in Washington DC on October 14, 2004.

=== Controversy over appointment as Director ===
Appointed as Director of Peace Corps under George W. Bush, Vasquez had donated $100,000 to Bush's campaign and was criticized by former Volunteers for lacking experience with, or previous membership in, Peace Corps. Los Angeles Times, Boston Globe, Washington Post and New York Times editorialized against Vasquez's nomination and returned Peace Corps volunteers signed a petition opposing his nomination. However Vasquez cleared the United States Senate Foreign Relations committee by a vote of 14–4, and was accepted in the full Senate on a voice vote.

=== Accomplishments as Director ===
Vasquez's major initiatives and accomplishments as Peace Corps Director include: an agreement with Mexico in 2003 to host volunteers, emphasis on recruitment of minorities and of community college graduates, upgrading Peace Corps' infrastructure, especially IT upgrades in the online application tracking process, the Volunteer Delivery System, an emphasis on safety and security of volunteers (including the creation of a Situation Room at Peace Corps Headquarters), modifying Peace Corps' "Five Year Rule" for employment, and the expansion of the Peace Corps to one of its highest levels in 30 years. Vasquez visited 60 countries during his tenure as Director, meeting with volunteers in the field to advance the agency's mission and goals of promoting world peace and friendship.

=== Minority recruitment ===
Vasquez placed a high priority on recruitment of minorities. During his confirmation hearings Vasquez said "We all recognize that the face of America looks vastly different today than 40 years ago - or even 10 years ago. In step with those changes, I consider it a high priority to expand the diversity of the Peace Corps so that it becomes a true reflection of America. Diversity of ethnic backgrounds, life experiences and beliefs has strengthened our country in countless ways. And in doing so we achieve an opportunity to engage a broader segment of the American population in one of our nation's greatest programs." Vasquez had a personal experience when he was visiting Morocco as Peace Corps Director that brought home to him the importance of his diversity initiatives. A young man stopped Vasquez and said, "You don't look like an American." And Vasquez answered, "What do you mean, I don't look like an American? Why do you say I don't look like an American?" He said, "The color of your skin. You don't look like an American." And I said, "Well, my grandparents came from Mexico to the United States, pursuing dreams and opportunities." By the end of Vasquez's tenure, 16 percent of the 7,810 volunteers were minorities — the highest percentage since the agency began collecting data on volunteer diversity.

=== National Call to Service program ===
Portions of the sometimes controversial expansion were successfully challenged by the Returned Peace Corps Volunteer community when former volunteers and the National Peace Corps Association raised objections to the continued inclusion of Peace Corps in the National Call to Service program, which had been used to allow military service members with at least three years and three months of military service completed, to finish their service obligation in the Peace Corps. Vasquez argued unsuccessfully for continued inclusion of the Peace Corps in that program, and the Peace Corps was removed from the National Call to Service program on December 22, 2005, when the United States Senate completed congressional action on the Department of Defense Authorization Act for Fiscal Year 2006.

=== Political briefings at Peace Corps Headquarters ===
On July 24, 2007, the Washington Post reported that during the tenure of Gaddi Vasquez as Peace Corps Director a "general political briefing" occurred at the Peace Corps headquarters after the 2002 midterm elections. Senator Joseph Biden, Chairman of the Senate Foreign Relations Committee, is seeking to determine whether the meetings complied with Hatch Act of 1939 that bars the use of federal resources—including office buildings, phones and computers—for partisan purposes. On July 25, 2007, in Senate subcommittee hearings chaired by Senator Chris Dodd, Peace Corps Director Ron Tschetter disclosed that approximately fifteen Peace Corps officials including then Director Gaddi Vasquez attended one of the political briefings at Peace Corps Headquarters. In testimony before the committee, Tschetter said that he did not condone the meetings and that in his opinion they should not have happened. Dodd concluded by saying that "The reputation of this institution suffers when that happens. We have a reputation and we have a good one over the years and to have it soiled because people want to turn it into a political operation is something that I am not going to tolerate at all and I will call for heads if there are still people there involved in this. They should know better than this, to engage in that kind of activity."

== Ambassador to FAO ==
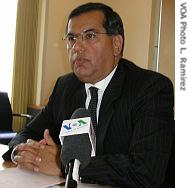
Gaddi Vasquez, U.S. ambassador for United Nations food and agriculture agencies, in 2008

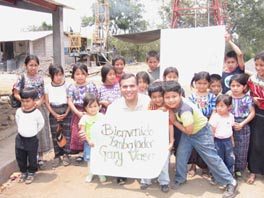
Gaddi Vasquez travels to Guatemala and Honduras as Ambassador to the United Nations Agencies in Rome to highlight U.S. support for humanitarian programs.

Vasquez resigned as Peace Corps Director September 7, 2006, after he was confirmed as the new United States Ambassador to the United Nations Agencies for Food and Agriculture in Rome, Italy. "The first day I went to work at the U.N., I was led into the governing council's meeting room for my first meeting," said Vasquez. "You see the nameplates around the table – France. U.K. Italy. United States of America. That's one of those moments you stop in your tracks and reflect on where you've been and what you're doing," Vasquez said. "I am fortunate, and blessed."

To publicize work done by the Food and Agriculture Organization of the United Nations, the International Fund for Agricultural Development, and the World Food Programme to help reduce poverty and make agriculture more productive, Ambassador Vasquez accompanied journalists on media tours to Mali in December, 2006 and to Guatemala and Honduras in May, 2007. His trips aim to increase visibility for the anti-hunger efforts of the United States and the international community around the world.

Vasquez has also spoken out on hunger to groups in the United States. In an address to the Orange Rotarians in Orange County, California on January 24, 2008, Vasquez talked about the $1 billion that the United States spends on food aid every year and how part of Vasquez's job is to make sure that money is spent as wisely as possible. "Over 840 million people suffer from chronic malnutrition," Vasquez said. "My hope is to raise your awareness. Consider how you can contribute to this effort."

The Daily Titan reported on April 21, 2008, that Vasquez had been the keynote speaker at the 'Connecting Worlds" conference at California State Fullerton speaking to about 250 conference members about global hunger. Vasquez said his life had been transformed while Director of the Peace Corps by the things he had witnessed traveling all over the world and recounted that once while in the Caribbean he had encountered a boy to whom he gave a piece of candy. The boy broke the candy in three, ate one piece and sold the other two. "This is the desperation some parts of the world are reaching," Vasquez said.

In October 2008, Vasquez visited Colombia accompanied by seven Latin American journalists. Vasquez visited a small sausage factory built with support from USAID that now employs 12 people and is providing food to the community. "It's a small thing but very significant, because it is sustainable entrepreneurship and is providing jobs," Vasquez said.

== Honors and awards ==
- Outstanding Alumni Award by the American Association of Community Colleges
- Coro Foundation Crystal Eagle Award
- Marine Corps Scholarship Fund Globe and Anchor Award
- Orange County Black Chamber of Commerce Award for Community Leadership
- Jewish National Fund Tree of Life Award
- B'nai B'rith Award for Leadership and Community Service
- City of Orange - Citizen of the Year 2012
- City of Orange - Legacy Award - City of Orange Police Department
- Orange County Hispanic Chamber of Commerce - Lifetime Achievement Award - 2013
- City of Orange Community Foundation - 2012 Legacy Award
- California Boys State - Hall of Fame - 2013
- Santa Ana College Foundation - Hall of Fame
- Orange High School - Hall of Fame
- McPherson Award - American Council of Young Political Leaders
- Salvation Army - William Booth Award
- Ellis Island Medal of Honor - 2014
- Hispanics in Energy - Legacy Award - 2014
- Distinguished Fellow - University of California, Irvine, School of Social Ecology 2013–14
- The President's Award - National Association of Latino Elected and Appointed Officials Educational Fund - 2017
- Constitutional Rights Foundation Award - 2015
- Latino Leaders Network - Eagle Leadership Award - 2016
- Salvation Army - The Others Award
- The Latino Coalition - 2018 Leadership Award
- Global Leadership Award - The Pat Brown Institute for Public Policy - 2019
- Orange County Influencers Leadership Award - Institute for Community Impact - 2019
- Orange County Distinguished Arts and Business Leader Award - The Segerstrom Center for the Performing Arts - 2019
- Orange County 500 - The Orange County Business Journal
- United States Hispanic Leadership Institute - National Hispanic Hero Award - 2023
- City of Orange Assistance League - Community Leadership Award - 2024
- Hispanics 100 - Chairman’s Leadership Award - 2024
- Gonzalez Northgate Markets - Juntos Award for Community Service - 2025
- Scouting America - Orange County - the Gaddi H Vasquez Leadership Award - 2025
- Inducted to the Orange County Hall of Fame - 2025
- Humanitarian Award - Kappa Alpha Psi fraternity - 2005

== Citations ==
Political offices
Preceded by William G. Steiner	Orange County Chair; 1995–1995; 1991-1992	Succeeded by Roger R. Stanton
Preceded by Don Roth	Orange County Vice Chair; 1994–1995; 1990-1991	Succeeded by Roger R. Stanton
Preceded by Bruce Nestande	Orange County Supervisor; 3rd District; 1987–1995	Succeeded by Donald Saltarelli
Government offices
Preceded by Mark L. Schneider	Director of the Peace Corps; 2002–2006	Succeeded by Ron Tschetter
