= Nicholas Craw =

American businessman (born 1936)

Director of the Peace Corps
- In office 1973–1974
- Nominated by: Gerald Ford
- Preceded by: Donald Hess
- Succeeded by: John Dellenback

Personal details
- Born: November 14, 1936 (age 89) Governors Island, New York, U.S.
- Party: Republican
- Education: Princeton University (BS); Harvard Business School (MBA)

Nicholas Craw (born 1936) is an American business owner. He served as the director of the Peace Corps between 1973 and 1974. Afterwards, he was president and CEO of the Sports Car Club of America and later US Sailing.
