= Donald A. Baer =

Chairman of the Board of PBS (born 1954)

Don Baer

White House Communications Director
- In office August 14, 1995 – July 31, 1997
- President: Bill Clinton
- Preceded by: Mark Gearan
- Succeeded by: Ann Lewis

White House Director of Speechwriting
- In office March 9, 1994 – August 14, 1995
- President: Bill Clinton
- Preceded by: David Kusnet
- Succeeded by: Michael Waldman

Personal details
- Born: September 17, 1954 (age 72) Fayetteville, North Carolina, U.S.
- Party: Democratic
- Spouse: Nancy Bard
- Education: University of North Carolina at Chapel Hill (BA); London School of Economics (MA); University of Virginia (JD)

Donald Aaron Baer (born September 17, 1954) is an American who has worked as a media lawyer, journalist, and a senior advisor to then-president Bill Clinton who was formerly Chairman of Burson Cohn & Wolfe. He was formerly the Worldwide Chair and CEO of Burson-Marsteller, a public relations firm, and is the current Chairman of the Board of PBS. Baer received his undergraduate education at the University of North Carolina at Chapel Hill, a masters in international relations at the London School of Economics, and a J.D. degree from the University of Virginia School of Law. He and his wife, Nancy Bard, wed in 1987.

Political offices
Preceded by Mark Gearan	White House Communications Director; 1995–1997	Succeeded by Ann Lewis
