= Mark Gearan =

Lawyer, former director of the US Peace Corps

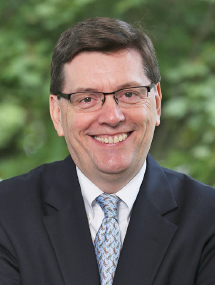

President of Hobart and William Smith Colleges
- Incumbent
- Assumed office July 2022
- Preceded by: Joyce Jacobsen
- In office August 1999 – August 2017
- Preceded by: Richard H. Hersh
- Succeeded by: Gregory J. Vincent

14th Director of the Peace Corps
- In office September 26, 1995 – August 11, 1999
- President: Bill Clinton
- Preceded by: Carol Bellamy
- Succeeded by: Mark L. Schneider

White House Communications Director
- In office June 7, 1993 – August 14, 1995
- President: Bill Clinton
- Preceded by: George Stephanopoulos
- Succeeded by: Don Baer

White House Deputy Chief of Staff for Policy
- In office January 20, 1993 – June 7, 1993
- President: Bill Clinton
- Preceded by: Robert Zoellick
- Succeeded by: Roy Neel

Personal details
- Born: September 19, 1956 (age 70) Gardner, Massachusetts, U.S.
- Party: Democratic
- Spouse: Mary Herlihy
- Children: 2 daughters
- Education: Harvard University (BA); Georgetown University (JD)
- Website: Official website

Mark Daniel Gearan (born September 19, 1956) is an American lawyer and the president of Hobart and William Smith Colleges in Geneva, New York. He previously served as a director at the Harvard Kennedy School Institute of Politics from 1995 to 1999 and as the director of the Peace Corps. He is the longest-serving president in the history of HWS, serving from 1999 to 2017 and again since 2022.

The HWS Board of Trustees awarded him an honorary degree in 2017 and named him President Emeritus of the Colleges. In 2018, Gearan joined Harvard University as 'President in Residence'.

Gearan has served as Chair of the National Campus Compact, the Corporation for National and Community Service, the Annapolis Group of selective liberal arts colleges, and the Talloires Network Steering Committee, an organization of college and university presidents.

== Early life and education ==
Gearan was born in Gardner, Massachusetts, and graduated from Gardner High School in 1974. Gearan earned his A.B. in government cum laude at Harvard University in 1978 and his J.D. degree from the Georgetown University Law Center in 1991. At Harvard, he was the college roommate of future lawyer and conservative talk show host Hugh Hewitt. His cousin is Anne Gearan, a political correspondent at The Washington Post.

== Career in politics and government ==
Gearan's early interest in politics began when he helped distribute leaflets in Jesuit priest Robert F. Drinan's campaign for Congress on a strong anti-Vietnam War platform in 1970. While an undergraduate at Harvard, Gearan interned in Drinan's Washington office and worked on Drinan's re-election campaign in 1978. It was there that Gearan met his future wife, Mary Herlihy, a fellow staffer in Drinan's office.

Gearan worked as a newspaper reporter for the Fitchburg, Massachusetts, Sentinel & Enterprise for one year. After leaving the newspaper, Gearan was chief of staff for U.S. Representative Berkley Bedell of Iowa for three years. In 1983, Massachusetts Governor Michael Dukakis appointed Gearan Director of Federal-State Relations for the Commonwealth of Massachusetts, a post he held until 1988, when Gearan joined Dukakis' campaign for the Presidency.

=== 1988 Presidential campaign ===
When Dukakis ran for the presidency in 1988, Gearan originally had the job of managing Dukakis' campaign during the crucial Iowa caucuses. When Gary Hart dropped out, the Dukakis campaign replaced Gearan with Hart's Iowa coordinator and sent Gearan back to Boston to be the campaign's national headquarters Press Secretary. Gearan accepted it.

When Bush announced on August 17, 1988, that he was selecting Dan Quayle as his running mate after previously saying he planned to keep his choice secret until later during the convention, Gearan stated, "We learned something about George Bush today. He can't keep a secret," and "he can't stand up to the pressure of the right wing." Gearan added that Bush had falsely accused Dukakis of opposing the Stealth bomber and the D-5, a nuclear missile used on the Trident submarine.

After the election, Gearan said that one of the mistakes Dukakis made after winning the Democratic nomination was not re-introducing himself to the American people. "One of the big mistakes we made in 1988 was we assumed people knew who Michael Dukakis was," said Gearan. After Dukakis' defeat, Mr. Gearan returned to run the Massachusetts Office of Federal Relations until 1989. Gearan was executive director of the Democratic Governors Association from 1989 to 1992. As executive director of the Democratic Governors Association, Gearan offered George Bush a slogan for his 1992 re-election campaign with a double-entendre: "Bush in '92. You Ain't Seen Nothin' Yet."

=== 1992 Presidential campaign ===
In 1991, Gearan was offered the job of Clinton's campaign communications chief while Clinton was seeking the Democratic nomination for president. Gearan was unable to accept because his wife was in a difficult pregnancy that confined her to bed for much of the time. When Clinton was accused of extramarital affairs and draft dodging, Gearan flew to New Hampshire to try to salvage Clinton's candidacy.

After Clinton won the nomination, Gearan became Al Gore's campaign manager during his run for the vice presidency. Gearan was named deputy director of the Clinton/Gore Transition Team in 1992, in charge of Washington operations for Transition Director Warren Christopher.

=== Clinton Administration ===
During the Clinton Administration, Gearan served in several roles. He began as the White House Deputy Chief of Staff. He was then promoted to Assistant to the President of the United States and Director of Communications and Strategic Planning. Gearan traveled extensively with the president on overseas trips to Russia, Japan, the Middle East, Germany, Italy, and Ireland. Gearan helped shepherd Supreme Court Justice Stephen Breyer through his confirmation hearings in 1994.

== Peace Corps ==
On June 22, 1995, President Clinton announced his nomination of Gearan to head the Peace Corps.

=== Controversy over nomination ===
There was some controversy over Gearan's appointment as Peace Corps Director since he had not served in the Peace Corps himself and was succeeding Carol Bellamy, who was the first Peace Corps Director to have served as a volunteer. The National Peace Corps Association (NPCA), an organization made up of returned volunteers, had urged President Clinton to appoint a former volunteer to the position rather than Gearan. However, Gearan was supported by other returned volunteers, including Donna Shalala, Clinton of Secretary of Health and Human Services, who had served in the Peace Corps in Iran and who addressed the NPCA at their annual meeting on August 4, 1995, in Austin, Texas.

=== Director ===
Gearan was confirmed by the United States Senate and sworn in as the 14th Director of the Peace Corps in September 1995. He was director of the Peace Corps from 1995 to 1999. During Gearan's tenure as Peace Corps Director, the Peace Corps opened programs in South Africa, Jordan, Mozambique, and Bangladesh and returned its volunteers to Haiti after a five-year absence.

On June 29, 1998, the United States and China formalized the Peace Corps program in China, signing an agreement that established a formal framework for a Peace Corps program in China. Twenty-one volunteers arrived to begin their assignments in Sichuan Province, where the Peace Corps has operated since 1993. President Clinton, in China for a state visit, said, "This agreement represents an important step forward in building the bonds of friendship between the American and Chinese people. As in the other 80 countries where they work, Peace Corps Volunteers in China reflect the finest traditions of Americans' idealism and pragmatic approach to assisting others."

=== Crisis Corps ===
Gearan's initiatives the Crisis Corps would later send former Peace Corps volunteers into crisis areas for six months or less to help during emergencies. However, Gearan later stated that he regretted that he had not moved faster in creating the corps.

On January 3, 1998, President Clinton proposed to expand the Peace Corps from about 6,500 volunteers to 10,000 volunteers by the year 2000. "President Clinton's initiative to put the Peace Corps on the path to have 10,000 volunteers serving overseas by the year 2000 is one of the most important developments in the history of the Peace Corps," Gearan said. "The President's initiative would result in a 50 percent increase in the number of Peace Corps volunteers. This is a strong affirmation of the contributions of 6,500 volunteers currently serving in 85 countries, as well as the work of more than 150,000 Americans who have joined the Peace Corps since 1961." However, the initiative failed to gain political traction or substantially increased funding in Congress and by the end of Clinton's term in office, the number of volunteers had made it to about 7,100.

== College President ==
On June 1, 1999, President Clinton announced that Gearan would be leaving the administration to accept the position of President of Hobart and William Smith Colleges in Geneva, New York. "One of the best personnel decisions I have made as President was to appoint Mark Gearan as the Director of the Peace Corps," Clinton said. Gearan explained why he left government to come to Hobart and William Smith. "College administration generally and, in particular, small, residential, liberal arts colleges have always been things I thought I would like to be a part of, because of their importance, because they are mission-oriented, because they are value-centered," Gearan said.

=== President's Forum ===
Gearan established a lecture series, the President's Forum, to bring international speakers to the university. Making use of personal contacts made during his thirty years in politics, speakers in the series have included Hillary Clinton, Robert Drinan, Sam Donaldson, Ralph Nader, Donna Shalala, Michael Dukakis, George Stephanopoulos, Barney Frank, George McGovern, Gloria Steinem, and Helen Thomas.

=== Projects ===
During Gearan's tenure, more than 80 capital projects were completed, including the construction of six new buildings namely the Bozzuto Boathouse (2003), Stern Hall (2003), Caird Hall (2005), de Cordova Hall (2005), The Katherine D. Elliott Studio Arts Center (2006), and the Gearan Center for the Performing Arts (2016). In January 2016, the Colleges celebrated the grand opening of the Gearan Center, a 65,000-square-foot facility. The board of trustees unanimously voted to name the building in honor of Mark D. and Mary Herlihy Gearan.

At the close of his first year at Hobart and William Smith, Gearan began the development of a five-year planning initiative called HWS 2005. He subsequently led the next two phases, HWS 2010 and HWS 2015, as well as Campaign for the Colleges, which raised more than $205 million to support facilities, endowment, and annual giving.

=== New York Times sexual assault story ===
A July 13, 2014, New York Times article detailed a case in which a Hobart and William Smith freshman reported a sexual assault by three students two weeks into her first year. Within two weeks, the college's investigation cleared the two men accused, despite medical evidence and a corroborating witness to one of the incidents and discrepancies in the alleged perpetrators' accounts of the evening. The story also alleged the members of the disciplinary panel that heard the case were uninformed about sexual assault and frequently changed the subject rather than hear the victim's account of events.

Gearan issued a response on July 13, 2014, stating that "even though we believe we handled the circumstances fairly and within the constraints of the law, and that we made decisions based on the evidence, there is no sense of satisfaction other than the knowledge that we treated everyone with compassion, kindness and respect." He went on to state that "HWS officials met with the Times reporter for two lengthy interviews and answered numerous questions via e-mail and phone, all in an effort to fully explain our approach and philosophy regarding sexual assault cases" and stated that "information that was provided to the Times reporter [was] largely missing from the article" and that transcripts of the hearings "were quoted out of context".

On July 16, 2014, he issued a second response, stating that "A group of faculty, staff, students and alums are working on a thorough review of our processes for sexual misconduct cases".

== Other activities and honors ==
Gearan is the recipient of 12 honorary degrees. Gearan serves on the boards of the National Association of Independent Colleges and Universities, the Points of Light Foundation, the Annapolis Group, the Corporation for National and Community Service, and The Partnership of Public Service.

On April 28, 2003, the Washington Post reported that Gearan's re-appointment to the board of the Corporation for National and Community Service had been kicked back by the Bush White House. On November 23, 2004, Gearan was confirmed by the U.S. Senate to serve on the board of the Corporation for National and Community Service. On November 30, 2007, the Rochester Democrat and Chronicle reported that Gearan was confirmed on November 16 to another three-year term on the Board of Directors of the Corporation for National and Community Service.

An article by the Associated Press on September 17, 2004, said that in the event of a Kerry win in the 2004 campaign for the presidency, Gearan would be a possible nominee for the post of Secretary of the Interior.

Political offices
Preceded by George Stephanopoulos	White House Director of Communications; 1993–1995	Succeeded by Don Baer
Government offices
Preceded by Carol Bellamy	Director of the Peace Corps; 1995–1999	Succeeded by Mark Schneider
