= Peace Corps =

U.S. international development program since 1961

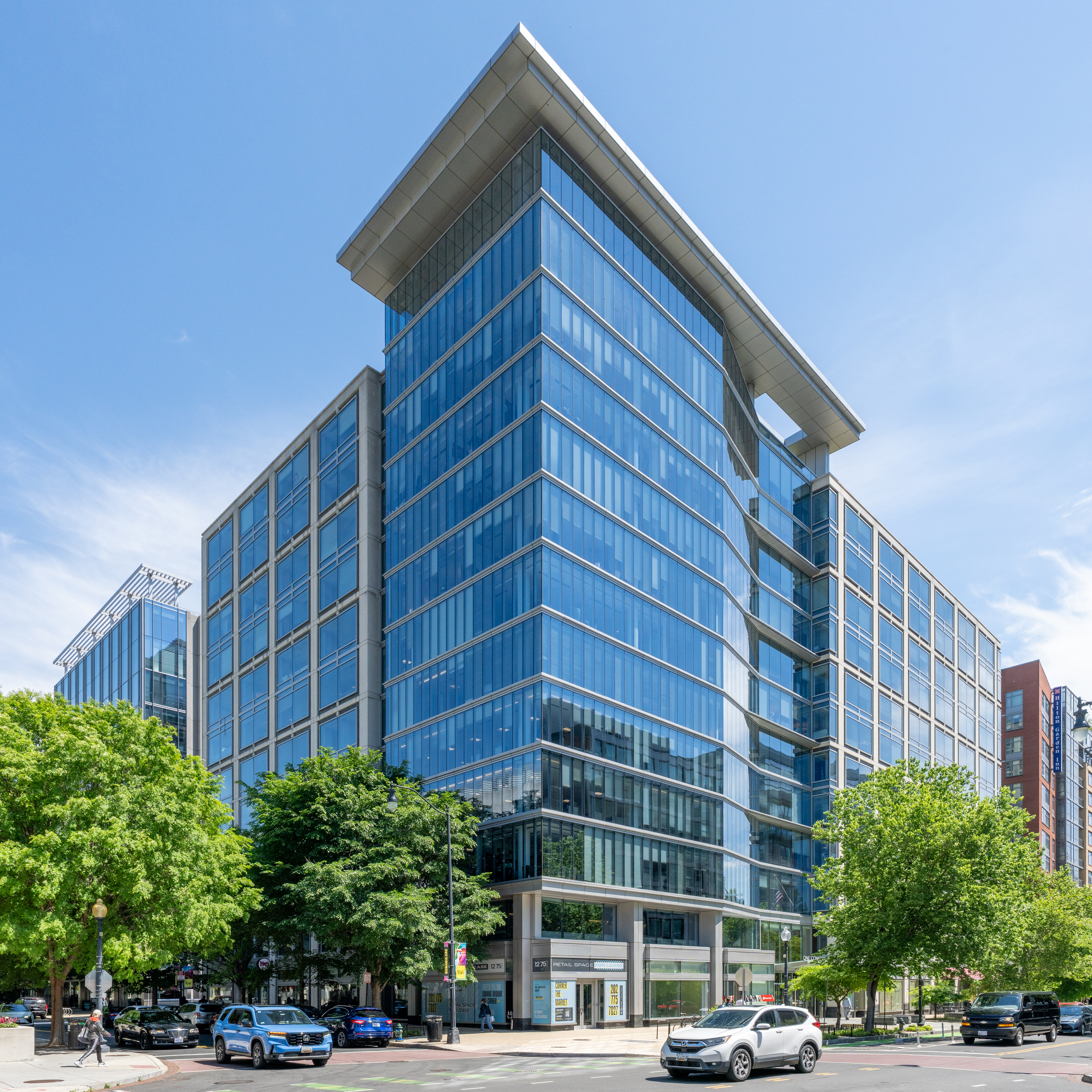
- Headquarters at 1275 First St NE

Agency overview
- Formed: March 1, 1961; 65 years ago
- Jurisdiction: United States government
- Headquarters: Washington, D.C.
- Annual budget: US$410.5 million (FY 2022)
- Agency executives: Christopher Landau, Acting Director of the Peace Corps; Richard Swarttz, Chief of Staff; Kris Besch, Deputy Chief of Staff
- Website: peacecorps.gov

Peace Corps Act
- Long title: An Act to provide for a Peace Corps to help the peoples of interested countries and areas in meeting their needs for skilled manpower.
- Enacted by: the 87th United States Congress

Citations
- Public law: Pub. L. 87-293
- Statutes at Large: 75 Stat. 612

Legislative history
- Introduced in the House as H.R. 7500 by Thomas E. Morgan on June 6, 1961; Senate: September 15, 1961; Signed into law by President John F. Kennedy on September 22, 1961

The Peace Corps is an independent agency and program of the United States government that trains and deploys volunteers to communities in partner countries around the world. It was established in March 1961 by an executive order (10924) of President John F. Kennedy and authorized by the United States Congress the following September by the Peace Corps Act on September 22, 1961.

The official goal of the Peace Corps is to assist developing countries by providing skilled workers in fields such as education, health, entrepreneurship, women's empowerment, and community development. Volunteers are American citizens, typically with a college degree, who are assigned to specific projects in certain countries based on their qualifications and experience. Following three months of technical training, Peace Corps members are expected to serve at least two years in the host country, after which they may request an extension of service. Volunteers are strongly encouraged to respect local customs, learn the prevailing language, and live in comparable conditions.

In its inaugural year, the Peace Corps had 900 volunteers serving in 16 countries, reaching its peak in 1966 with 15,556 volunteers in 52 countries. Following budget cuts in 1989, the number of volunteers declined to 5,100, though subsequent increases in funding led to renewed growth into the 21st century; by its 50th anniversary in 2011, there were over 8,500 volunteers serving in 77 countries. As of 2015, more than 240,000 Americans had joined the Peace Corps and served in 142 countries.

== History ==
=== 1950–1959 ===
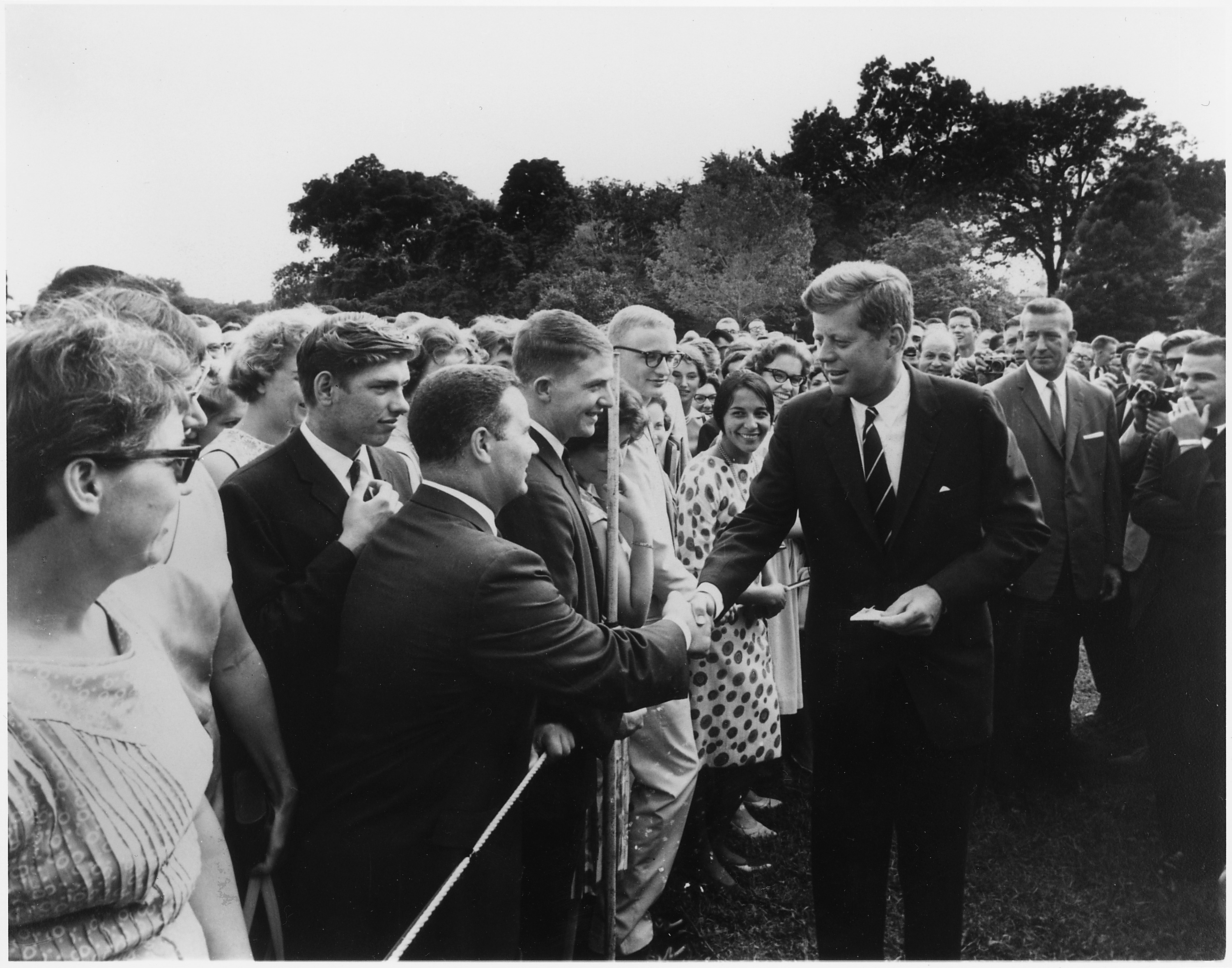
John F. Kennedy greets volunteers on August 28, 1961

In 1950, Walter Reuther, president of the United Auto Workers, proposed, in an article titled, "A Proposal for a Total Peace Offensive," that the United States establish a voluntary agency for young Americans to be sent around the world to fulfill humanitarian and development objectives. Subsequently, throughout the 1950s, Reuther gave speeches to the following effect:

I have been saying for a long time that I believe the more young Americans who are trained to join with other young people in the world to be sent abroad with slide rule, textbook, and medical kit to help people help themselves with the tools of peace, the fewer young people will need to be sent with guns and weapons of war.

In addition, following the end of World War II, various members of the United States Congress proposed bills to establish volunteer organizations in developing countries. In December 1951, Representative John F. Kennedy (D-Massachusetts) suggested to a group that "young college graduates would find a full life in bringing technical advice and assistance to the underprivileged and backward Middle East ... In that calling, these men would follow the constructive work done by the religious missionaries in these countries over the past 100 years." In 1952 Senator Brien McMahon (D-Connecticut) proposed an "army" of young Americans to act as "missionaries of democracy". Privately funded nonreligious organizations began sending volunteers overseas during the 1950s. While Kennedy is credited with the creation of the Peace Corps as president, the first initiative came from Senator Hubert H. Humphrey, Jr. (D-Minnesota), who introduced the first bill to create the Peace Corps in 1957—three years before Kennedy, as a presidential candidate, would raise the idea during a campaign speech at the University of Michigan. In his autobiography The Education of a Public Man, Humphrey wrote,

There were three bills of particular emotional importance to me: the Peace Corps, a disarmament agency, and the Nuclear Test Ban Treaty. The President, knowing how I felt, asked me to introduce legislation for all three .... I introduced the first Peace Corps bill in 1957. It did not meet with much enthusiasm. Some traditional diplomats quaked at the thought of thousands of young Americans scattered across their world. Many senators, including liberal ones, thought it a silly and unworkable idea. Now, with a young President urging its passage, it became possible and we pushed it rapidly through the Senate. It is fashionable now to suggest that Peace Corps volunteers gained as much, or more, from their experience as the countries where they worked. That may be true, but it ought not to demean their work. They touched many lives and made them better.

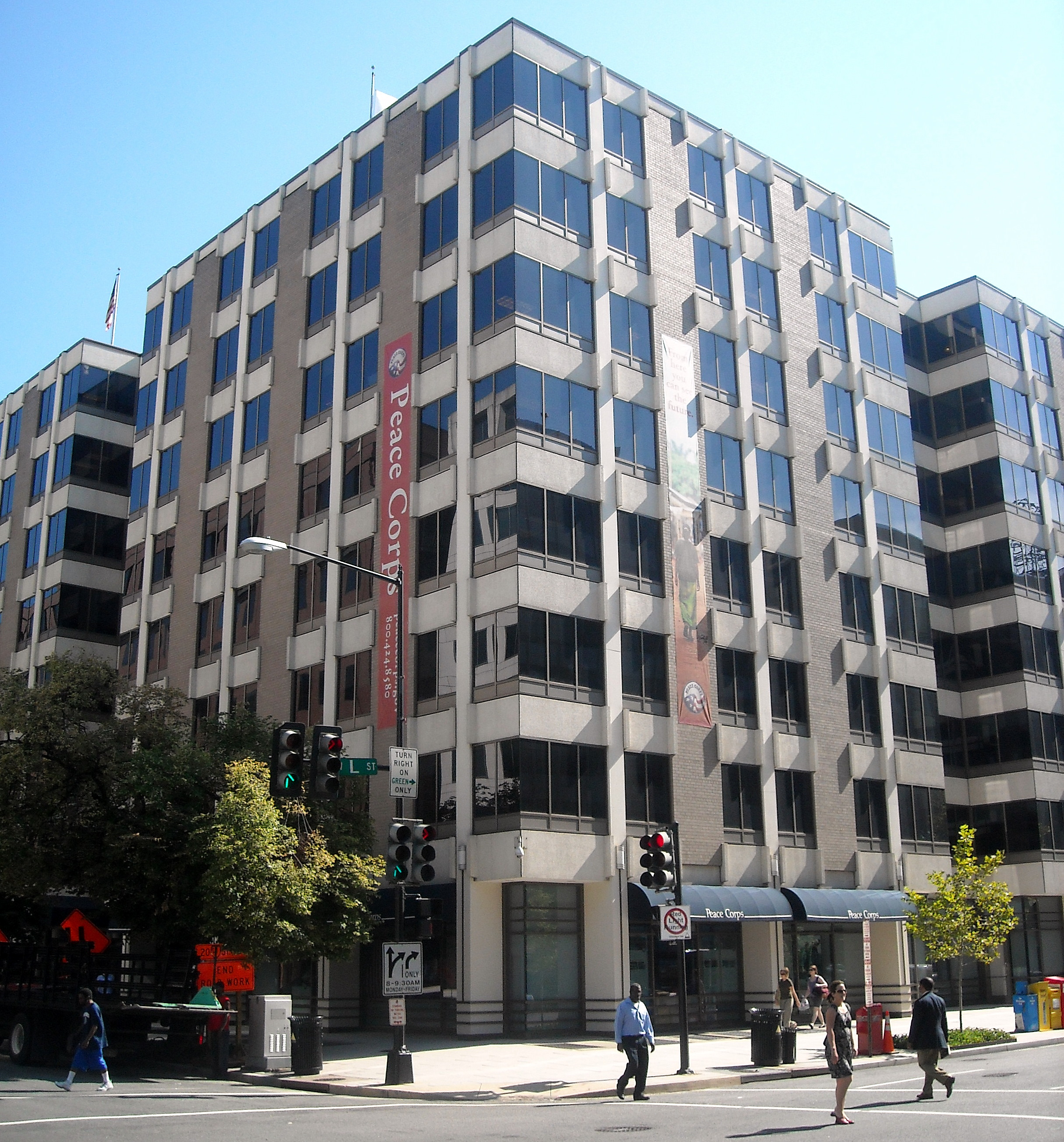
The former Peace Corps headquarters at 1111 20th Street, NW in downtown Washington, D.C.

Only in 1959 did the idea receive serious attention in Washington when Congressman Henry S. Reuss of Wisconsin proposed a "Point Four Youth Corps". In 1960, he and Senator Richard L. Neuberger of Oregon introduced identical measures calling for a nongovernmental study of the idea's "advisability and practicability". Both the House Foreign Affairs Committee and the Senate Foreign Relations Committee endorsed the study, the latter writing the Reuss proposal into the pending Mutual Security legislation. In this form it became law in June 1960. In August the Mutual Security Appropriations Act was enacted, making available US$10,000 for the study, and in November ICA contracted with Maurice Albertson, Andrew E. Rice, and Pauline E. Birky of Colorado State University Research Foundation for the study.

=== 1960–1969 ===
In August 1960, following the 1960 Democratic National Convention, Walter Reuther visited John F. Kennedy at the Kennedy compound in Hyannisport to discuss Kennedy's platform and staffing of a future administration. It was there that Reuther got Kennedy to commit to creating the executive agency that would become the Peace Corps. Under Reuther's leadership, the United Auto Workers had earlier that summer put together a policy platform that included a "youth peace corps" to be sent to developing nations. Subsequently, at the urging of Reuther, John F. Kennedy announced the idea for such an organization on October 14, 1960, at a late-night campaign speech at the University of Michigan in Ann Arbor on the steps of the Michigan Union. He later dubbed the proposed organization the "Peace Corps." A brass marker commemorates the place where Kennedy stood. In the weeks after the 1960 election, the study group at Colorado State University released their feasibility report a few days before Kennedy's Presidential Inauguration in January 1961.

Critics opposed the program. Kennedy's opponent, Richard M. Nixon, predicted it would become a "cult of escapism" and "a haven for draft dodgers."

While others doubted whether recent graduates had the necessary skills and maturity for such a task, the idea was popular among students, and Kennedy pursued it. He asked respected academics such as Max Millikan and Chester Bowles to help him outline the organization and its goals. During his inaugural address, Kennedy again promised to create the program: "And so, my fellow Americans: ask not what your country can do for you—ask what you can do for your country". President Kennedy in a speech at the White House on June 22, 1962, "Remarks to Student Volunteers Participating in Operation Crossroads Africa", acknowledged that Operation Crossroads for Africa was the basis for the development of the Peace Corps. "This group and this effort really were the progenitors of the Peace Corps and what this organization has been doing for a number of years led to the establishment of what I consider to be the most encouraging indication of the desire for service not only in this country but all around the world that we have seen in recent years". The Peace Corps website answered the question "Who Inspired the Creation of the Peace Corps?", acknowledging that the Peace Corps was based on Operation Crossroads Africa founded by Rev. James H. Robinson.

Establishment of the Peace Corps
John F. Kennedy's announcement of the establishment of the Peace Corps

On March 1, 1961, Kennedy signed Executive Order 10924 that officially started the Peace Corps. Concerned with the growing tide of revolutionary sentiment in the Third World, Kennedy saw the Peace Corps as a means of countering the stereotype of the "Ugly American" and "Yankee imperialism," especially in the emerging nations of post-colonial Africa and Asia. Kennedy appointed his brother-in-law, Sargent Shriver, to be the program's first director. Shriver fleshed out the organization and his think tank outlined the organization's goals and set the initial number of volunteers. The Peace Corps began recruiting in July 1962; Bob Hope recorded radio and television announcements hailing the program.

Until about 1967, applicants had to pass a placement test of "general aptitude" (knowledge of various skills needed for Peace Corps assignments) and language aptitude. After an address from Kennedy, who was introduced by Rev. Russell Fuller of Memorial Christian Church, Disciples of Christ, on August 28, 1961, the first group of volunteers left for Ghana and Tanganyika (now part of Tanzania). The program was formally authorized by Congress on September 22, 1961, and within two years over 7,300 volunteers were serving in 44 countries. This number increased to 15,000 in June 1966, the largest number in the organization's history.

The organization experienced controversy in its first year of operation. On October 13, 1961, a postcard from a volunteer named Margery Jane Michelmore in Nigeria to a friend in the U.S. described her situation in Nigeria as "squalor and absolutely primitive living conditions." This postcard never made it out of the country. The University of Ibadan College Students Union demanded deportation and accused the volunteers of being "America's international spies" and the project as "a scheme designed to foster neocolonialism." Soon the international press picked up the story, leading several people in the U.S. administration to question the program. Nigerian students protested the program, while the American volunteers sequestered themselves and eventually began a hunger strike. After several days, the Nigerian students agreed to open a dialogue with the Americans.

==== Vietnam War ====
The Vietnam War notably affected the Peace Corps in terms of both draft evasion and volunteer protests.

Joining the Peace Corps became an option for avoiding the draft, either by applying to the Peace Corps and claiming it was unrelated to the draft, or by joining as a fulfilment of the alternative service required to maintain Conscientious Objector status. Joining the Peace Corps secured draft deferment, agreed upon at its creation in 1961, though as the war continued several deferments were not granted and volunteers were forced to end their service early. In 1967, Peace Corps director Jack Vaughn made a case against drafting PCVs to the Presidential Appeals Board, but was not successful in securing deferments for volunteers.

Many existing Peace Corps volunteers stationed around the world protested the Vietnam War, forcing a response from the Peace Corps as a government program. Bruce Murray, a volunteer in Chile, wrote a letter in 1967 protesting the war and sent it to the New York Times, which did not publish it. It was published locally in Chile and Murray's service was terminated without opportunity to contest or appeal, and he was subsequently drafted after being refused Conscientious Objector status. Murray sued in 1969 and won, and the Peace Corps began to tolerate more forms of protest from volunteers, though this was an unofficial leniency that would be ignored if the protest was too public or drew too much attention, examples including volunteers in Bolivia criticising the war in PCV-produced publication Pues, and the 1970 protest outside the US embassy in Afghanistan for US vice president Agnew's visit.

=== Policies ===
The theme of enabling Americans to volunteer in poor countries appealed to Kennedy because it fit in with his campaign themes of self-sacrifice and volunteerism, while also providing a way to redefine American relations with the Third World. Upon taking office, Kennedy issued an executive order establishing the Peace Corps. Shriver, not Kennedy, energetically lobbied Congress for approval. Kennedy proudly took the credit, and ensured that it remained free of CIA influence. He largely left its administration to Shriver, who was often advised by Sally Bowles, particularly regarding maternity protocol for PCVs and representation of the Peace Corps overseas. To avoid the appearance of favoritism to the Catholic Church, the Corps did not place its volunteers with any religious agencies. In the first twenty-five years, more than 100,000 Americans served in 44 countries as part of the program. Most volunteers taught English in local schools, but many became involved in activities like construction and food delivery. Shriver practiced affirmative action, and women comprised about 40 percent of the first 7000 volunteers. Given the paucity of black college graduates, racial minorities never reached five percent. The Corps developed its own training program, based on nine weeks at an American university, with a focus on conversational language, world affairs, and desired job skills. That was followed by three weeks at a Peace Corps camp in Puerto Rico, and a week or two of orientation in the home and the host country.

=== 1970–1999 ===
In July 1971, President Richard Nixon, an opponent of the program, brought the Peace Corps under the umbrella agency ACTION. President Jimmy Carter, an advocate of the program, said that his mother, who had served as a nurse in the program at 70, had "one of the most glorious experiences of her life" in the Peace Corps. She was also the oldest to volunteer at the time until Audrey Thixton from Tulsa Oklahoma volunteered at 75 in 2008 serving in Armenia. In 1979, he made the Peace Corps fully autonomous in an executive order. This independent status was further secured by 1981 legislation making the organization an independent federal agency.

In 1976, Deborah Gardner was found murdered in her home in Tonga, where she was serving in the Peace Corps. Dennis Priven, a fellow Peace Corps worker, was later charged with the murder by the Tonga government. He was found not guilty by reason of insanity, and was sentenced to serve time in a mental institution in Washington D.C. Priven was never admitted to any institution, and the handling of the case has been heavily criticized.

=== 2000–present ===
Although the earliest volunteers were typically thought of as generalists, the Peace Corps had requests for technical personnel from the start. For example, geologists were among the first volunteers requested by Ghana, an early volunteer host. An article in Geotimes (a trade publication) in 1963, reviewed the program, with a follow-up history of Peace Corps geoscientists appearing in that publication in 2004. During the Nixon Administration the Peace Corps included foresters, computer scientists, and small business advisers among its volunteers.

In 1982, President Ronald Reagan appointed director Loret Miller Ruppe, who initiated business-related programs. For the first time, a significant number of conservative and Republican volunteers joined the Corps, as the organization continued to reflect the evolving political and social conditions in the United States. Funding cuts during the early 1980s reduced the number of volunteers to 5,380, its lowest level since the early years. Funding increased in 1985, when Congress began raising the number of volunteers, reaching 10,000 in 1992.

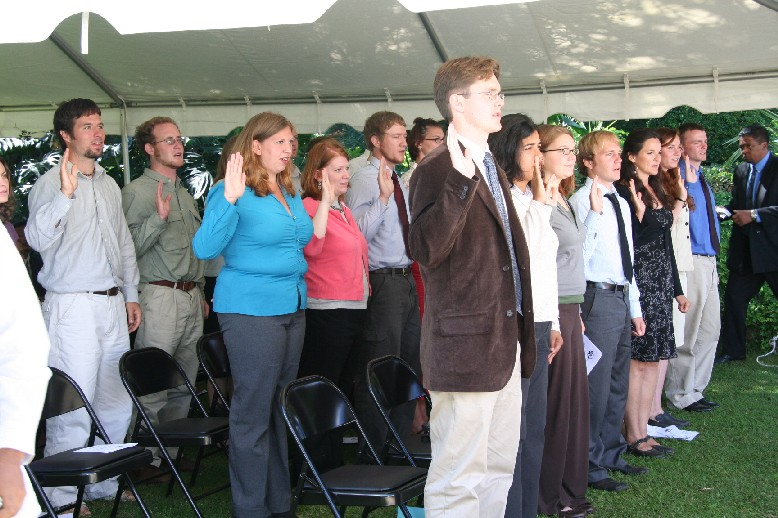
Peace Corps trainees swearing in as volunteers in Madagascar, April 26, 2006.

After the 2001 September 11 attacks, which alerted the U.S. to growing anti-U.S. sentiment in the Middle East, President George W. Bush pledged to double the size of the organization within five years as a part of the war on terrorism. For the 2004 fiscal year, Congress increased the budget to US$325 million, US$30 million above that of 2003 but US$30 million below the president's request.

As part of an economic stimulus package in 2008, President Barack Obama proposed to double the size of the Peace Corps. However, as of 2010, the amount requested was insufficient to reach this goal by 2011. In fact, the number of applicants to the Peace Corps declined steadily from a high of 15,384 in 2009 to 10,118 in 2013. Congress raised the 2010 appropriation from the US$373 million requested by the President to US$400 million, and proposed bills would raise this further for 2011 and 2012. According to former director Gaddi Vasquez, the Peace Corps is trying to recruit more diverse volunteers of different ages and make it look "more like America". A Harvard International Review article from 2007 proposed to expand the Peace Corps, revisit its mission, and equip it with new technology. In 1961 only 1% of volunteers were over 50, compared with 5% today.

In 2009, Casey Frazee, who was sexually assaulted while serving in South Africa, created First Response Action, an advocacy group for a stronger Peace Corps response for volunteers who are survivors or victims of physical and sexual violence. In 2010, concerns about the safety of volunteers were illustrated by a report, compiled from official public documents, listing hundreds of violent crimes against volunteers since 1989. In 2011, a 20/20 investigation found that "more than 1,000 young American women have been raped or sexually assaulted in the last decade while serving as Peace Corps volunteers in foreign countries."

In a historic first, all Peace Corps volunteers worldwide were withdrawn from their host countries on March 15, 2020, due to the COVID-19 pandemic. Volunteers were not eligible for unemployment or health benefits, although some Members of Congress said they should be. Legislators also called upon FEMA to hire Peace Corps volunteers until the end of their service.

In June 2020, the Peace Corps ended its programs in China.

== Application and volunteer process ==
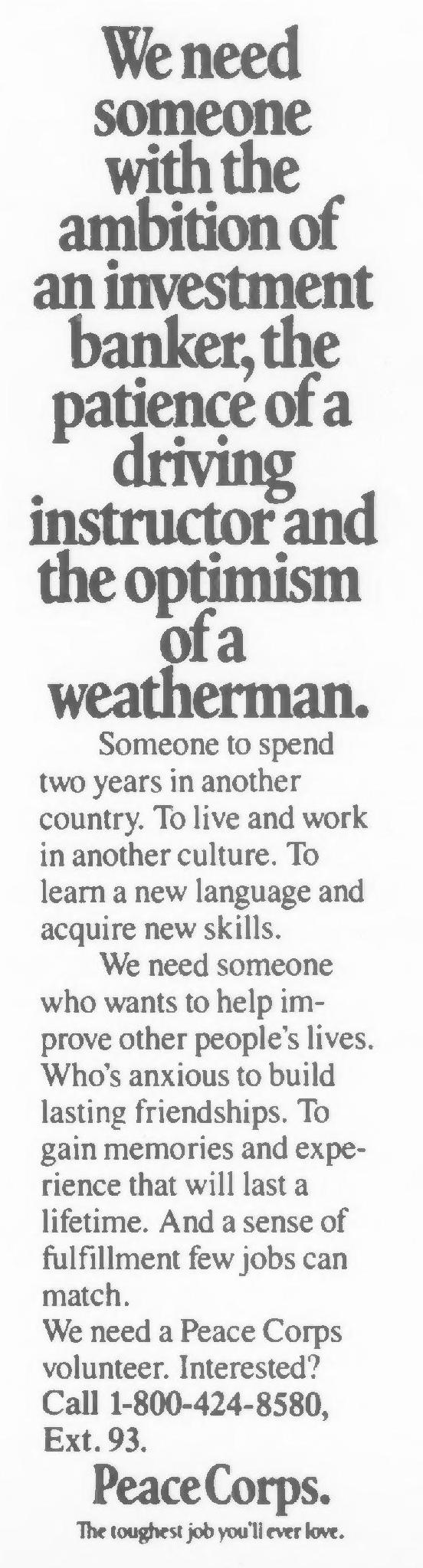
Recruitment advert placed in a 1990 issue of State Magazine

The application for the Peace Corps takes up to one hour, unless one talks to a recruiter. The applicant must be at least 18 years old and a U.S. citizen and, according to a 2018 document, is advised to apply six to nine months before they want to leave. They must go through an interview.

Applicants can apply to only one placement every year. Placements can be sorted through the Peace Corps' six project sectors: Agriculture, Environment, Community Economic Development, Health, Education, and Youth in Development. Applicants may also narrow down their application of choice by country they want to serve in various regions of the world.

Peace Corps volunteers are expected to serve for two years in the foreign country, with three months of training before swearing in to service. This occurs in-country with host country national trainers in language and assignment skills.

Prior to 2014, the application process took about a year.

There is no maximum age limit to joining the Peace Corps. Married couples may join but cannot have any "dependent children". Most positions require a volunteer to have at least a bachelor's degree but this can vary depending on the field one is volunteering in. Volunteers in the Peace Corps do not receive wages but transportation costs are paid for and a stipend is given for "basic expenses". Anyone who has worked for the CIA is ineligible, however prospective volunteers who have worked in other intelligence services can serve ten years after being employed in intelligence. All volunteers must provide their medical information.

== Initiatives ==
The Peace Corps aims to educate community members on the different illnesses that are present in developing countries as well as what treatments exist in order prevent these illnesses from spreading. Volunteers are also often there in order to teach community members about modern agricultural techniques in order for them to more effectively produce food for themselves and each other. The Corps is also a proponent of equal education and moves to allow for equal education opportunities for girls in countries like Liberia and Ethiopia. In 2015, the organization partnered with USAID to implement First Lady Michelle Obama's Let Girls Learn initiative.

=== Eradicating malaria in Africa ===
The Corps launched its initiative to engage volunteers in malaria control efforts in 2011. The initiative, which grew out of malaria prevention programs in Peace Corps Senegal, now includes volunteers in 24 African countries.

=== Environment ===
The Corps offers a variety of environmental programs. Needs assessments determine which programs apply to each country. Programs include effective and efficient forms of farming, recycling, park management, environmental education, and developing alternative fuel sources. Volunteers must have some combination of academic degrees and practical experience.

The three major programs are Protected-Areas Management, Environment Education or Awareness, and Forestry.

In Protected-Areas Management, volunteers work with parks or other programs to teach resource conservation. Volunteer activities include technical training, working with park staff on wildlife preservation, organizing community-based conservation programs for sustainable use of forests or marine resources, and creating activities for raising revenue to protect the environment.

Environment Education or Awareness focuses on communities that have environmental issues regarding farming and income. Programs include teaching in elementary and secondary schools; environmental education to youth programs; creation of environmental groups; support forest and marine resource sustainability; ways of generating money; urban sanitation management; and educating farmers about soil conservation, forestry, and vegetable gardening.

Forestry programs help communities conserve natural resources through projects such as soil conservation, flood control, creation of sustainable fuels, agroforestry (e.g., fruit and vegetable production), alley cropping, and protection of biodiversity.

=== Peace Corps Response ===
Peace Corps Response, formerly named the Crisis Corps, was created by Peace Corps Director Mark Gearan in 1996. Gearan modeled the Crisis Corps after the National Peace Corps Association's successful Emergency Response Network (ERN) of Returned Peace Corps Volunteers willing to respond to crises when needed. ERN emerged in response to the 1994 Rwandan genocide. On November 19, 2007, Peace Corps Director Ronald Tschetter changed Crisis Corps's name to Peace Corps Response.

The change to Peace Corps Response allowed Peace Corps to include projects that did not rise to the level of a crisis. The program deploys former volunteers on high-impact assignments that typically range from three to twelve months in duration.

Peace Corps Response volunteers generally receive the same allowances and benefits as their Peace Corps counterparts, including round-trip transportation, living and readjustment allowances, and medical care. Minimum qualifications include completion of at least one year of Peace Corps service, including training, in addition to medical and legal clearances. The Crisis Corps title was retained as a unique branch within Peace Corps Response, designed for volunteers who are deployed to true "crisis" situations, such as disaster relief following hurricanes, earthquakes, floods, volcanic eruptions and other catastrophes.

=== Education and languages ===
Peace Corps has created resources for teachers in the US and abroad to teach 101 languages. Resources vary by language, and include text, recordings, lesson plans and teaching notes.

== Laws governing the Peace Corps ==
=== Executive orders ===
Peace Corps was originally established by Executive Order, and has been modified by several subsequent executive orders including:

- 1961 – Executive Order 10924 – Establishment and administration of the Peace Corps in the Department of State (Kennedy)
- 1962 – Executive Order 11041 – Continuance and administration of the Peace Corps in the Department of State (Kennedy)
- 1963 – Executive Order 11103 – Providing for the appointment of former Peace Corps volunteers to the civilian career services (Kennedy)
- 1971 – Executive Order 11603 – Assigning additional functions to the Director of ACTION (Nixon)
- 1979 – Executive Order 12137 – The Peace Corps (Carter)

=== Laws ===
Federal laws governing the Peace Corps are contained in Title 22 of the United States Code – Foreign Relations and Intercourse, Chapter 34 – The Peace Corps.

=== Code of Federal Regulations ===
The Peace Corps is subject to Federal Regulations as prescribed by public law and executive order and contained in Title 22 of the Code of Federal Regulations under Chapter 3.

=== Limitations on former volunteers ===
Former members of the Peace Corps may not be assigned to military intelligence duties for a period of 4 years following Peace Corps service. Furthermore, they are forever prohibited from serving in a military intelligence posting to any country in which they volunteered. Former members may not apply for employment with the Central Intelligence Agency for a period of 5 years following Peace Corps Service.

=== Time limits on employment ===
Peace Corps employees receive time-limited appointments, and most employees are limited to a maximum of five years of employment. This time limit was established to ensure that Peace Corps' staff remain fresh and innovative. A related rule specifies that former employees cannot be re-employed until after the same amount of time that they were employed. Volunteer service is not counted for the purposes of either rule.

== Union representation ==
Non-supervisory domestic employees are represented by the American Federation of State, County, and Municipal Employees (AFSCME) Local 3548. The Federal Labor Relations Agency certified the Union on May 11, 1983. About 500 domestic employees are members. The current collective bargaining agreement became effective on April 21, 1995.

== Leadership ==
=== Directors ===
On January 3, 2018, President Donald Trump nominated Josephine "Jody" Olsen as the 20th director of the Peace Corps. Olsen has a long history with the agency, serving as acting director in 2009, deputy director from 2002 to 2009, Chief of Staff from 1989 to 1992, Regional Director, North Africa Near East, Asia, Pacific from 1981 to 1984, and Country Director in Togo from 1979 to 1981. Olsen also served as a Peace Corps volunteer in Tunisia from 1966 to 1968. She left office on January 20, 2021.

In April 2022, President Biden nominated Carol Spahn as director to succeed Olsen, and she was confirmed by the United States Senate on December 13, 2022. Spahn was acting director from January 20, 2021, until November 16, 2021, and CEO from November 2021 to November 2022. She had previously served as a Peace Corps volunteer in Romania and subsequently returned as Country Director in Malawi, then Chief of Operations for Eastern and Southern Africa, following a career in the NGO and private sectors. Spahn left office on January 20, 2025, along with Deputy Director David White, Jr.

President Trump did not appoint a new director or deputy director during the first six months of his second term. During administrative transitions, the Peace Corps is typically led by a chief executive officer or acting director until a director is appointed and confirmed. Initially, Dr. Allison Greene was named chief executive officer under the second Trump administration, with Cheryl Gregory Faye as deputy chief executive officer. On Aug. 12, 2025, the Peace Corps announced that Greene, Faye and acting chief of staff Julie Burns had resigned. The same announcement said acting chief financial officer Paul Shea would step in as chief executive officer and that Kris Besch, from the Office of Global Operations, would assume the duties of deputy chief executive officer. It also said Karen Roberts, who had been a senior advisor in the Office of the Director, would assume the duties of acting chief of staff.

The full list of directors is as follows:

No.	Image	Director	Service dates	Appointed by	Summary of Wikipedia page
1		R. Sargent Shriver	1961–1966	Kennedy	President Kennedy appointed Shriver three days after signing the executive order. Volunteers arrived in five countries during 1961. In just under six years, Shriver developed programs in 55 countries with more than 14,500 volunteers.
2		Jack Vaughn	1966–1969	Johnson	Vaughn improved marketing, programming, and volunteer support as large numbers of former volunteers joined the staff. He also promoted volunteer assignments in conservation, natural resource management, and community development.
3		Joseph Blatchford	1969–1971	Nixon	Blatchford served as head of the new ACTION agency, which included the Corps. He created the Office of Returned Volunteers to help volunteers serve in their communities at home, and initiated New Directions, a program emphasizing volunteer skills.
4		Kevin O'Donnell	1971–1972	Nixon	O'Donnell's appointment was the first for a former Peace Corps country director (Korea, 1966–70). He fought budget cuts, and believed strongly in a non-career Peace Corps.
5		Donald Hess	1972–1973	Nixon	Hess initiated training of volunteers in the host country where they would eventually serve, using host country nationals. The training provided more realistic preparation, and costs dropped for the agency. Hess also sought to end the downsizing of the Peace Corps.
6		Nicholas Craw	1973–1974	Nixon	Craw sought to increase the number of volunteers in the field and to stabilize the agency's future. He introduced a goal-setting measurement plan, the Country Management Plan, which gained increased Congressional support and improved resource allocation across the 69 participating countries.
7		John Dellenback	1975–1977	Ford	Dellenback improved volunteer health care available. He emphasized recruiting generalists. He believed in committed applicants even those without specific skills and instead training them for service.
8		Carolyn R. Payton	1977–1978	Carter	Payton was the first female director and the first African American. She focused on improving volunteer diversity.
9		Richard F. Celeste	1979–1981	Carter	Celeste focused on the role of women in development and increased women and minority participation, particularly for staff positions. He invested heavily in training, including the development of a worldwide core curriculum.
10		Loret Miller Ruppe	1981–1989	Reagan	Ruppe was the longest-serving director and championed women in development roles. She launched the Competitive Enterprise Development program, the Caribbean Basin Initiative, the Initiative for Central America and the African Food Systems Initiative.
11		Paul Coverdell	1989–1991	G.H.W. Bush	Coverdell established two programs with a domestic focus. World Wise Schools enabled U.S. students to correspond with overseas volunteers. Fellows/USA assisted Returned Peace Corps volunteers in pursuing graduate studies while serving local communities.
12		Elaine Chao	1991–1992	G.H.W. Bush	Chao was the first Asian American director. She expanded Peace Corps' presence in Eastern Europe and Central Asia by establishing the first Peace Corps programs in Latvia, Lithuania, Estonia, and other newly independent countries.
13		Carol Bellamy	1993–1995	Clinton	Bellamy was the first RPCV (Returned Peace Corps volunteer) (Guatemala 1963–65) to be director. She reinvigorated relations with former volunteers and launched the Corps' web site.
14		Mark D. Gearan	1995–1999	Clinton	Gearan established the Crisis Corps, a program that allows former volunteers to help overseas communities recover from natural disasters and humanitarian crises. He supported expanding the corps and opened new volunteer programs in South Africa, Jordan, Bangladesh and Mozambique.
15		Mark L. Schneider	1999–2001	Clinton	Schneider was the second RPCV (El Salvador, 1966–68) to head the agency. He launched an initiative to increase volunteers' participation in helping prevent the spread of HIV/AIDS in Africa, and also sought volunteers to work on information technology projects.
16		Gaddi Vasquez	2002–2006	G.W. Bush	Gaddi H. Vasquez was the first Hispanic American director. His focus was to increase volunteer and staff diversity. He also led the establishment of a Peace Corps program in Mexico.
17		Ron Tschetter	September 2006 – 2008	G.W. Bush	The third RPCV to head the agency, Tschetter served in India in the mid-1960s. He launched an initiative known as the "50 and Over," to increase the participation of older men and women.
18		Aaron S. Williams	August 2009 – September 2012	Obama	Aaron S. Williams became director on August 24, 2009. Mr. Williams is the fourth director to have served as a volunteer. Williams cited personal and family considerations as the reason for his stepping down as Peace Corps Director on September 17, 2012.
19		Carrie Hessler-Radelet	September 2012 – January 2017	Obama	Carrie Hessler-Radelet became acting director of the Peace Corps in September 2012. Previously, Hessler-Radelet served as deputy director of the Peace Corps from June 23, 2010, until her appointment as acting director. From 1981 to 1983, she served as a Peace Corps volunteer in Western Samoa with her husband, Steve. She was confirmed as Director on June 5, 2014.
20		Jody Olsen	February 2018 – January 2021	Trump	Jody Olsen was confirmed Director of the Peace Corps on February 27, 2018. Olsen previously served the Peace Corps as acting director in 2009, deputy director from 2002 to 2009, Chief of Staff from 1989 to 1992, Regional Director, North Africa Near East, Asia, Pacific from 1981 to 1984, and Country Director in Togo from 1979 to 1981. Olsen also served as a Peace Corps volunteer in Tunisia from 1966 to 1968.
21		Carol Spahn	January 2023 – January 2025	Biden	Carol Spahn previously served in acting capacity in this position from January to November 2021. She was then appointed CEO of the Peace Corps and served from November 2021 to November 2022, later being nominated as director in April 2022. Spahn also served as Chief of Operations for Eastern and Southern Africa, Country Director for Malawi, and a volunteer in Romania.

=== Deputy director ===
The deputy director of the Peace Corps is the only other Senate-confirmed position at the agency. Notable deputy directors include former White House press secretary Bill Moyers, as well as two former directors, Jody Olsen and Carrie Hessler-Radelet.

=== Inspector general ===
The Peace Corps Office of Inspector General is authorized by law to review all programs and operations of the Peace Corps. The OIG is an independent entity within the Peace Corps. The inspector general (IG) reports directly to the Peace Corps Director. In addition, the IG reports to Congress semiannually with data on OIG activities. The OIG serves as the law enforcement arm of the Peace Corps and works closely with the Department of State, the Department of Justice, and other federal agencies. The OIG has three sections to conduct its functions:

Audit – Auditors review functional activities of the Peace Corps, such as contract compliance and financial and program operations, to ensure accountability and to recommend improved levels of economy and efficiency;

Evaluations – Evaluators analyze the management and program operations of the Peace Corps at both overseas posts and domestic offices. They identify best practices and recommend program improvements and ways to accomplish Peace Corps' mission and strategic goals.

Investigations – Investigators respond to allegations of criminal or administrative wrongdoing by Peace Corps Volunteers, Peace Corps personnel, including experts and consultants, and by those who do business with the Peace Corps, including contractors.

From 2006 to 2007, H. David Kotz was the Inspector General. As of 2023, the Inspector General is Joaquin E. Ferrao.

== Criticism and new directions ==
Critics and criticisms of Peace Corps include former volunteer and country director Robert L. Strauss in Foreign Policy, The New York Times, The American Interest and elsewhere, an article by a former volunteer describing assaults on volunteers from 1992 to 2010, an ABC news report on 20/20, a Huffington Post article on former Peace Corps volunteers speaking out on rapes, and About.com's article on rape and assault in the Peace Corps.

In the Reagan Administration, in 1986, an article in the Multinational Monitor looked critically at the Peace Corps. On a positive note, the writer praises the Corps for aspects saying that it is "not in the business of transferring massive economic resources. Rather it concentrates on increasing productivity and encouraging self-reliance in villages that are often ignored by large-scale development agencies," and notes the "heavy emphasis on basic education" by the Corps.

Many returned volunteers complain that the Peace Corps does little to promote or make use of their rich experiences once they return [...] [a] Peace Corps volunteer is sent in [...] [to relieve] the local government from having to develop policies that assure equitable distribution of health care [...] During the early years there were many failures in structure and programming [...] Some critics charge that the Peace Corps is only a somewhat ineffective attempt to counter damage done to the U.S. image abroad by its aggressive military and its unscrupulous businesses [...] Many observers and some returned volunteers charge that, in addition to public relations for the United States, Peace Corps programs serve to legitimize dictators [...] When he began evaluating the Corps in the 1960s, Charlie Peters found "they were training volunteers to be junior diplomats. Giving them a course in American studies, world affairs and communism [...] Although it seems unlikely that the Peace Corps is used in covert operations, wittingly or not it is often used in conjunction with U.S. military interests [...] In a review of the Peace Corps in March the House Select Committee on Hunger praised the agency for effective work in the areas of agriculture and conservation, while recommending that the Corps expand its African Food Systems Initiative, increase the number of volunteers in the field, recruit more women, and move to depoliticize country dictatorships.

The author suggests that "the poor should be encouraged to organize a power base to gain more leverage with the powers-that-be" by the Peace Corps and that "The Peace Corps is the epitome of Kennedy's Camelot mythology. It is a tall order to expect a small program appended to an immense superpower, to make a difference, but it is a goal worth striving for."

In December 2003, a report by the Brookings Institution praised the Peace Corps, but proposed changes. These include relabeling Peace Corps volunteers in certain countries, greater host country ownership, reverse volunteers (have volunteers from the host country in the U.S.), and multilateral volunteers. The Brookings Institution wrote that a "one-year service commitment [for the Baby Boom generation] could make the Peace Corps more attractive to older Americans, possibly combined with the option of returning to the same site or country after a three-month break" and customized placement to a specific country would increase the number of people volunteering.

In a critique by The Future of Freedom Foundation, James Bovard mixes history of the Peace Corps with current interpretations. He writes that in the 1980s, "The Peace Corps's world-saving pretensions were a joke on American taxpayers and Third World folks who expected real help." He goes on to criticize the difference in rhetoric and action of Peace Corps volunteers, even attacking its establishment as "the epitome of emotionalism in American politics." Using snippets of reports, accounts of those in countries affected by the Peace Corps and even concluded that at one point "some Peace Corps agricultural efforts directly hurt Third World poor." At the end of the article, Bovard noted that all Peace Corps volunteers he had talked with conceded they have not helped foreigners, but he acknowledges that "Some Peace Corps volunteers, like some Americans who volunteer for religious missions abroad, have truly helped foreigners."

Over the past decade, new directions for the Peace Corps have emerged. Christopher Hedrick outlined "The New Peace Corps" in a Yale Journal of International Affairs essay published in 2013. Hedrick, who was then both the Country Director for Peace Corps Senegal and the originator and coordinator of the Peace Corps malaria prevention initiative across sub-Saharan Africa, argued that the Peace Corps was "building upon a new generation's passion and technological know-how to make a difference in the everyday lives of people in developing countries across the globe. The agency is undergoing a profound transformation, and volunteers' service no longer resembles the traditional notion of the Peace Corps experience." While retaining the unique focus on deep understanding and relations with host communities, the New Peace Corps embraced professionalism among volunteers and staff, leveraged technology to improve communications and enhance the ability of host communities to access needed resources, and deepened partnerships with local, national, and international development partners. While some found this vision threatening to the iconic notion of the lone Peace Corps volunteer, the agency rapidly adopted this approach in significant initiatives such as the food security alliance with USAID's Feed the Future Initiative, the collaboration on malaria prevention and treatment with African health ministries and the U.S. President's Malaria Initiative, and the increased focus on ensuring high levels of volunteer fluency in local languages.

United States senator Rick Scott criticized the Peace Corps operations in China for failing to do enough to promote capitalism and American values, and for not coordinating activities with the State Department.

=== Sexual assault ===
The Peace Corps has been criticized for failing to properly respond to the sexual violence that many of its female volunteers face. BoingBoing editor Xeni Jardin described criticism of the agency's response to assault: "A growing number of ex-Peace Corps volunteers are speaking out about having survived rape and other forms of sexual assault while assigned overseas. They say the agency ignored their concerns for safety or requests for relocation, and tried to blame rape victims for their attacks. Their stories, and support from families and advocates, are drawing attention from lawmakers and promises of reform from the agency". Among 8,655 volunteers there are on average 22 Peace Corps women who reported being the victims of rape or attempted rape each year.

At a meeting of the House Foreign Affairs Committee in 2011, Peace Corps volunteers shared their experiences of violence and sexual assault. At this meeting, it was found that between 2000 and 2009 there had been several cases of rape or attempted rape, and about 22 women were sexually assaulted each year. The case of murdered Peace Corps volunteer Kate Puzey was discussed. The Peace Corps gained attention in the media and their directors have been attacked for how they handled this situation. Kate Puzey's mother was one of those to make a comment at the meeting about how badly the situation with her daughter had been handled. One woman claimed that her country's director had blamed her for getting raped, while other victims have also been similarly blamed. Criticism of how Peace Corps has responded to sexual assaults against volunteers culminated in the appointment of Kellie Green as the agency's first Director of the Office of Victims Advocacy in 2011. Green was eventually pushed out of her position in April 2015 for purportedly "creating a hostile work environment". Green maintains that Peace Corps retaliated against her for pressing agency officials to fully comply with their responsibilities towards volunteers who have been victims of sexual assault. A Change.org petition demanding that Green be reinstated began circulating among former volunteers in December 2015.

In 2009, the most recent year reported, 69% of Peace Corps crime victims were women, 88% were under 30, and 82% were Caucasian. Worldwide, there were 15 cases of rape/attempted rape and 96 cases of sexual assault reported for a total of 111 sexual crimes committed against female Peace Corps volunteers. The majority of women who join the Peace Corps are in their mid-twenties. In 62% of the more than 2,900 assault cases since 1990, the victim was identified as being alone. In 59% of assault cases, the victim was identified as a woman in her 20s.

== In popular culture ==
Frank Zappa and The Mothers of Invention have a song named "Who Needs the Peace Corps?" on their 1968 album We're Only in It for the Money.

In popular culture, the Peace Corps has been used as a comedic plot device in such movies and television shows as Airplane!, Christmas with the Kranks, Shallow Hal, Lost, and Volunteers or used to set the scene for a historic era, as when Frances "Baby" Houseman tells the audience she plans to join the Peace Corps in the introduction to the movie Dirty Dancing.

The Peace Corps has also been documented on film and examined more seriously and in more depth. The 2006 documentary film Death of Two Sons, directed by Micah Schaffer, juxtaposes the deaths of Amadou Diallo, a Guinean-American who was gunned down by four New York City policemen with 41 bullets, and Peace Corps volunteer Jesse Thyne, who lived with Amadou's family in Guinea and died in a car crash there. Jimi Sir, released in 2007, is a documentary portrait of volunteer James Parks' experiences as a high school science, math and English teacher during the last 10 weeks of his service in Nepal. James speaks Nepali fluently and shows a culture where there are no roads, vehicles, electricity, plumbing, telephone or radio. The movie El Rey, directed and written by Antonio Dorado in 2004, attacks corrupt police, unscrupulous politicians and half-hearted revolutionaries but also depicts the urban legend of Peace Corps volunteers "training" native Colombians how to process coca leaves into cocaine.

== See also ==
- List of notable Peace Corps volunteers
- AmeriCorps
- Language education
- List of language self-study programs
- Peace Corps Memorial
- Provincial Reconstruction Team
- United States Cultural Exchange Programs
- British Romanian Educational Exchange
- CUSO
- Doctors Without Borders
- EU Aid Volunteers
- European Voluntary Service
- Fredskorpset
- International Voluntary Services
- JICA (Japan International Cooperation Agency)
- Korea International Cooperation Agency
- United Nations Volunteers
- Voluntary Service Overseas
- World Vision
