= Carol Spahn =

American government official

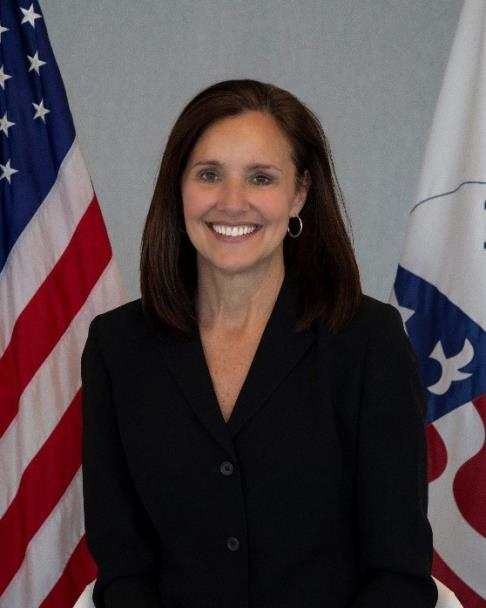

21st Director of the Peace Corps
- In office December 21, 2022 – January 20, 2025
- President: Joe Biden
- Preceded by: Jody Olsen
- Succeeded by: TBD

Personal details
- Education: Catholic University of America (BA); George Washington University (MA)

Carol Spahn is an American executive who served as director of the Peace Corps from 2022 to 2025.

== Education ==
Spahn earned a Bachelor of Arts degree from the Catholic University of America and a Master of Arts in international development from the Elliott School of International Affairs at George Washington University.

== Career ==
Spahn served as a Peace Corps volunteer in Romania from 1994 to 1996. She later worked as the senior vice president of operations at Women for Women International and executive director of the Accordia Global Health Foundation. She was also the vice president, CFO, and treasurer of Small Enterprise Assistance Funds. Spahn has held executive positions at GE Capital and KPMG. She later returned to the Peace Corps to serve as a country director in Malawi and as chief of operations for eastern and southern Africa.

=== Biden Administration ===
On January 20, 2021, President Joe Biden designated Spahn as acting director of the Peace Corps, and she served in this capacity until November 16, 2021, and as CEO from November 2021 until November 2022.

In April 2022, President Joe Biden nominated Spahn to serve as director of the agency. Hearings on her nomination were held by the United States Senate Committee on Foreign Relations on November 30, 2022, and her nomination was reported favorably by the committee on December 7, 2022. The United States Senate confirmed her nomination by voice vote on December 13, 2022. She was sworn in on January 11, 2023.

Government offices
Preceded by Jody Olsen	Director of the Peace Corps; 2023–present	Incumbent
