= Jody Olsen =

American government official (born 1942)

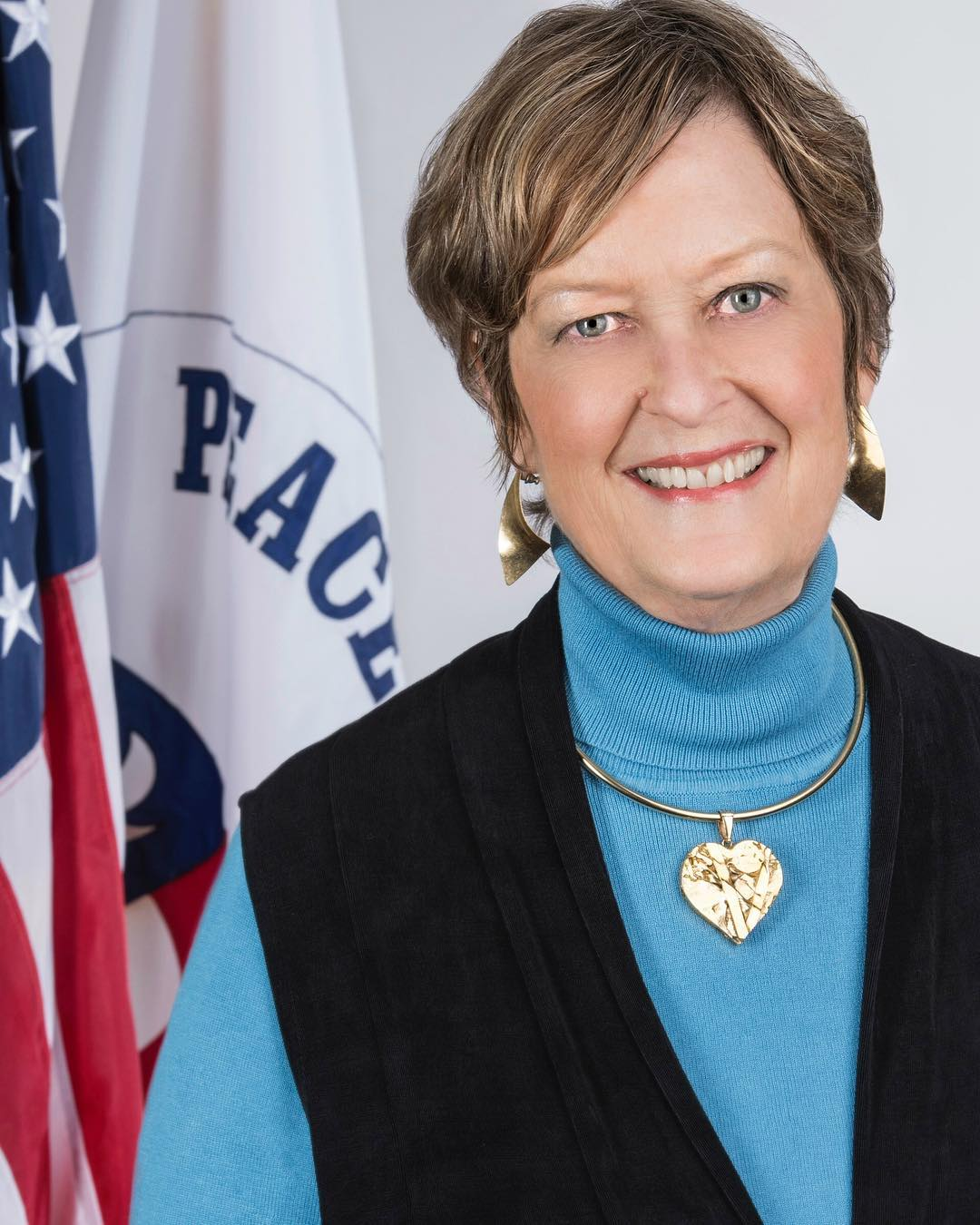

20th Director of the Peace Corps
- In office March 30, 2018 – January 20, 2021
- President: Donald Trump
- Preceded by: Carrie Hessler-Radelet
- Succeeded by: Carol Spahn

Personal details
- Born: Josephine King; December 16, 1942 (age 83) Utah, U.S.
- Party: Republican
- Parent: David S. King (father)
- Relatives: Edmund Rice (ancestor), William H. King (grandfather); Janne M. Sjödahl (great-grandfather); Culbert Olson (first cousin twice-removed)
- Education: University of Utah (BA); University of Maryland, Baltimore (MSW; PhD)

Josephine King Olsen (born 1942) served as the 20th Director of the Peace Corps from 2018 to 2021. She was appointed by President Donald Trump, and sworn in on March 30, 2018, after being confirmed by the Senate.

== Early life and education ==
Olsen was born in Utah and moved to Maryland in 1959 after her father, David S. King, was elected to the United States House of Representatives as a Democrat. Her grandfather, William H. King, represented Utah in the Senate from 1917 to 1941. Olsen graduated from Walter Johnson High School in Bethesda, Maryland in 1961.

Olsen received a bachelor's degree from the University of Utah as well as a master's degree in social work and doctorate in human development from the University of Maryland, Baltimore.

== Career ==
Olsen worked as a Peace Corps volunteer in Tunisia from 1966 to 1968. From 1979 to 1981, she served as the Country Director in Togo before becoming the Regional Director for North Africa, Near East, Asia, and Pacific (NANEAP) from 1981 to 1984. From 1984 until 1989, Olsen served as Vice President of Youth for Understanding, a national student exchange organization.

She was the Peace Corps Chief of Staff from 1989 to 1992, the executive director of the International Exchange of Scholars (CIES) from 1992 until 1997, the senior vice president of the Academy for Educational Development from 1997 until 2002, a development consultancy. Olsen served as the Deputy Director of the Peace Corps from 2002 to 2009. She also served for a time as acting country director for Kazakhstan.

After leaving the Peace Corps in 2009, Olsen served as visiting professor at the University of Maryland - Baltimore School of Social Work and Director of the University's Center for Global Education Initiatives.

Olsen was nominated to be the director of the Peace Corps on January 3, 2018. She was confirmed by the United States Senate on March 22, 2018.

== Personal life ==
Olsen grew up as a member of the Church of Jesus Christ of Latter-day Saints. In 2005, she was still identified by The Salt Lake Tribune as a Mormon.

Government offices
| Preceded by Carrie Hessler-Radelet | Director of the Peace Corps; 2018–2021 | Succeeded by Carol Spahn |
