= Economic Development Cooperation Fund =

South Korea government agency

The Economic Development Cooperation Fund (EDCF) (Korean: 대외경제협력기금) is an agency created by the government of South Korea in 1987 to promote economic cooperation between South Korea and developing countries. In addition to the EDCF, South Korea provides official development assistance (ODA) through the Korea International Cooperation Agency.

The more than 500 projects the EDCF has worked on to provide international cooperation include:

- US$70 million in loans to Ghana and Tanzania
- US$200 million in aid to Bangladesh, the Philippines and Cambodia
- The Jalaur River Multi-Purpose Project Stage II
- Up to US$8 billion in long-term loans to Ukraine
- US$1.7 billion for 30 development projects in Bangladesh

In 2025, the Ministry of Economy and Finance announced 14.1 trillion won in ODA to be provided over the following three years.
