= British Romanian Educational Exchange =

BREDEX is the British Romanian Educational Exchange. It is a volunteer organisation which sends university students from the UK to a number of cities in Romania to teach conversational English.

The programme was set up in 1990 by John West, a Reuters journalist, immediately after the Romanian revolution. In the summer of that year, seven British students travelled to three universities (Bucharest, Brașov and Iași) offering English courses to local students. Those seven students returned to Romania in December 1990 to set up English courses for the following summer.

The programme runs during the summer vacation and students go for between 5 and 7 weeks depending on the city that they are in. Initially, the students came from Oxford University, Cambridge University and Manchester University. Now the students are being recruited from a wider pool of universities including Queen Mary, University of London, University of Southampton, Durham University, King's College London, the University of Cambridge and the University of Oxford. They are sent to various cities in groups ranging from 2-6. The cities include Bucharest, Craiova, Galaţi, Iaşi, Sibiu and Timișoara. BREDEX has also, on occasion, provided courses in the smaller settlement of Bozovici, situated in the south west of Romania.

In each city conversational English classes are taught for around three hours a day to both children and young adults. The classes are as varied and flexible as the teachers wish to make them. Complete creative control is entrusted to the teachers who are all selected through a rigorous interview process. Typically, those being taught will be split into groups depending on a combination of their age and ability. Class sizes can range depending on local interest in the scheme and how many teachers there are. A lot of the teachers' time is usually spent absorbing the local culture with fellow teachers and local students. The atmosphere is quite informal and often more English is taught outside of the classroom than inside. As well, TEFL careers have also started from BREDEX so teachers can be as serious as they like.

In the middle of the programme the teachers are given one week's leave for independent travel.

According to testament handed down to the current organisers from previous participants, BREDEX has been running since 1991.

In her book "To Romania with Love" (https://www.amazon.co.uk/Romania-With-Love-Tessa-Dunlop/dp/0704372576) Tessa Dunlop's second visit to Romania is with BREDEX.

== Galaţi ==
In Galaţi the teaching occurs at the city's university. A tutor at the university liaises with the students organising rooms and advertising the classes locally before the students arrive. The teachers are housed in student accommodation a short walk from the main University building.

In Galaţi there is also a close link with the International student organisation AIESEC whose offices are next door to the accommodation provided to the teachers. AIESEC provides the teachers with access to other university students both Romanian and international. There is also a burgeoning relationship with the United States Peace Corps who are setting up an English language library.

== Craiova ==
Similarly to Galati, a tutor at the university organises rooms in the main building of the University of Craiova and accommodation in one of the student hostels, as well as advertising in local highschools and various university buildings.

In 2010, classes took place from 12 July to 27 August, Monday to Friday, from 10:00 to 13:00 with a week off in the middle.
