= David Mixner =

American political activist and author (1946–2024)

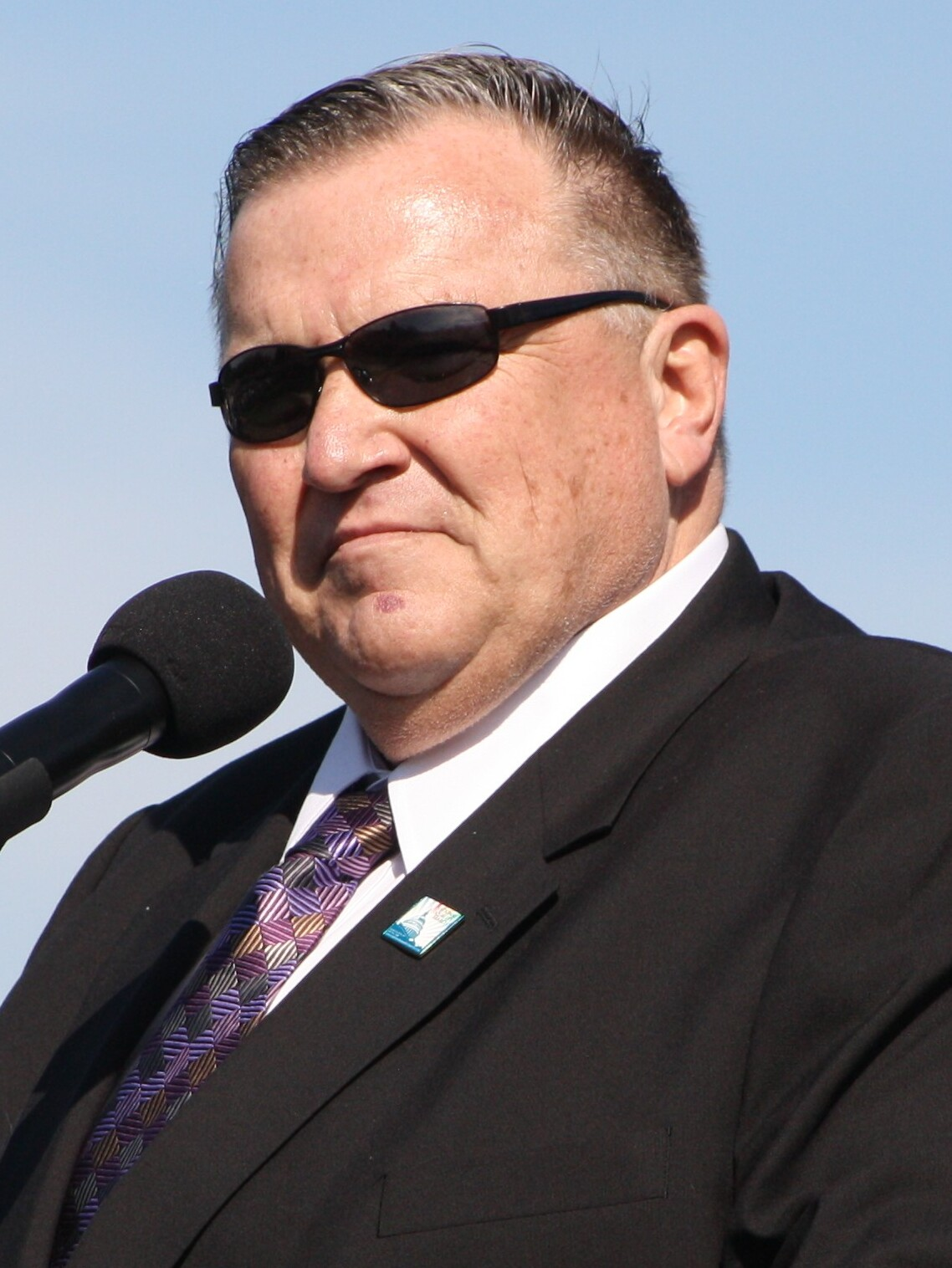
- Mixner in 2009
- Born: David Benjamin Mixner; August 16, 1946; Bridgeton, New Jersey, U.S.
- Died: March 11, 2024 (aged 77); New York City, U.S.
- Resting place: Hart Island
- Occupations: Political activist; author
- Political party: Democratic

David Benjamin Mixner (August 16, 1946 – March 11, 2024) was an American political activist and author. He was best known for his work in anti-war and gay rights advocacy.

Mixner played a key role in defeating Proposition 6 in California, which sought to ban gays and lesbians from being schoolteachers. He also organized the Moratorium to End the War in Vietnam in 1969, drawing millions of protesters nationwide. Mixner later became involved in Bill Clinton's presidential campaigns but criticized Clinton's "Don't Ask, Don't Tell" policy, which led to a rift between them.

Mixner continued his activism throughout his life, focusing on issues like nuclear disarmament, AIDS awareness, and LGBT rights. He was honored for his activism and writing, including receiving an honorary doctorate from Washington College in 2015.

== Early life ==
Mixner was born in Bridgeton, New Jersey, on August 16, 1946, and was raised nearby in the small town of Elmer. His father Ben worked on a corporate farm, and his mother Mary worked shifts at a local glass factory and later took a job as a bookkeeper for the local John Deere dealership. Mixner had two older siblings, Patsy Mixner Annison and Melvin Mixner. He was raised in the Catholic faith and said that Pope John XXIII, the Vatican, and liberation theology had a great influence on him.

Mixner attended Daretown Elementary School, then Woodstown High School, where he got involved in the Civil Rights Movement, by participating in picketing and sending his own money to Martin Luther King Jr. In his memoir, Stranger Among Friends, Mixner explains that his parents were "livid" over his involvement in the Civil Rights Movement, claiming his activism embarrassed them. When Mixner told them he wanted to go south during the summer of 1963 after following the events in Birmingham, Alabama, his parents forbade him.

== Career ==
=== College and early activism ===
In the fall of 1964, Mixner enrolled at Arizona State University in Tempe, Arizona, where he soon became involved in civil rights and anti-war activism, including helping to organize protests against a speech by General William Westmoreland. Prompted by an article he read in The Arizona Republic about city garbage workers who were seeking the right to unionize, in the fall of 1966, Mixner organized the first of many protests he would organize over the next thirty years. Mixner rallied hundreds of workers, students, and professors and led a march on City Hall. Although the city successfully broke the strike, the workers eventually earned the right to unionize.

Mixner found himself much more interested in activism, including LGBTQ rights, than in pursuing a college degree. While at the University of Maryland, Mixner was a grassroots organizer for the 1967 March on the Pentagon, which was later captured in Norman Mailer’s Armies of the Night.

=== McCarthy presidential campaign ===
Later that year, Mixner dropped out of college and began working for the presidential campaign of Eugene McCarthy. One of Mixner's first assignments was organizing the Minnesota operation, helping McCarthy win the Minnesota caucus, defeating incumbent President Lyndon B. Johnson. Later, Mixner and other members of McCarthy's campaign team went to Georgia to help select an alternative delegation to send to the national convention in Chicago, challenging Governor Lester Maddox's hand-picked delegation, which included only seven African-Americans in the 117 person delegation. The Georgia Democratic Party Forum, which sought to challenge Maddox's delegation, held its own convention in Macon, where Congressman John Conyers (D–MI) keynoted their convention before turning over the floor to Julian Bond, the first African-American elected to the Georgia legislature, who would later become Chairman of the NAACP.

At the 1968 Democratic National Convention in Chicago, Mixner was allegedly beaten by police during the protests held outside the convention center. After Vice President Hubert Humphrey claimed the nomination, Mixner began seeking out new outlets for his activism. He soon befriended Doris Kearns Goodwin, who introduced Mixner to Senator Ted Kennedy, who he claimed would become a lifelong friend.

=== Democratic Party Delegate Selection Committee ===
In early 1969, Mixner was invited to join the Delegate Selection Committee, where he served as his generation's voice, and he intended to use the platform to raise the issue of the violence at the previous year's convention.

=== The Moratorium to End the War in Vietnam ===
Mixner served as an organizer of the Moratorium to End the War in Vietnam. The idea was prompted by Jerome Grossman, a Massachusetts businessman active in the peace movement. Grossman proposed to Sam Brown, a close friend of Mixner, that they set aside a day in 1969 where "business as usual" would come to a halt, essentially engaging in a strike against everything. Brown decided that the word "moratorium" would be less threatening than "strike" to middle-class Americans, and set to work, setting aside October 15, 1969, as the day of the moratorium. Brown soon enlisted the help of Mixner, David Hawk, another young activist, and Marge Sklencar, whom they knew from the McCarthy campaign.

Bill Clinton, at the time a Rhodes Scholar at Oxford University, visited the headquarters of the moratorium and suggested to Mixner that he organize a parallel protest at Oxford. This protest of about a thousand people gathered in front of the American embassy in London would later be a significant issue in Clinton's presidential campaign, with President George H. W. Bush telling Larry King on CNN in October 1992, "Maybe I'm old-fashioned, but to go to a foreign country and demonstrate against your own country when your sons and daughters are dying halfway around the world, I am sorry but I think that is wrong."

The Moratorium drew millions of people throughout the country, who gathered in public places and read the names of the soldiers killed in Vietnam aloud. The day was capped off by a march at the Washington Monument, where Coretta Scott King, the widow of Martin Luther King Jr., spoke about her late husband's passion for ending the war.

Mixner's commentary on the Moratorium is featured in the documentary, The Movement and the "Madman," which debuted on the PBS series American Experience in 2023.

=== Municipal Elections Committee of Los Angeles (MECLA) ===
In 1976, Mixner began the process of coming out of the closet, and soon thereafter was a founding member of the Municipal Elections Committee of Los Angeles (MECLA), the nation's first gay and lesbian Political Action Committee. At the time, very few candidates were willing to accept donations from openly gay individuals or gay-affiliated organizations. At the time, Mixner was also serving as the campaign manager for Tom Bradley, the mayor of Los Angeles who was seeking reelection; so while he worked to raise funds for MECLA, his involvement was kept secret because of the potential for his sexuality to become an issue in Bradley's campaign.

=== "NO on 6" campaign ===
Soon after Bradley won reelection easily, Mixner turned his focus to fighting Proposition 6, an initiative placed on the California ballot by Orange County State Senator John Briggs that would make it illegal for gays and lesbians to be schoolteachers. Similar initiatives had recently passed throughout the country when Mixner turned his focus to fighting Proposition 6, creating the "NO on 6" organization to fight it; through the process, he would publicly come out of the closet. Mixner and his lover Peter Scott secured a meeting with former Governor and future President Ronald Reagan, whom they convinced to oppose the initiative publicly. As a result, and through the work of Mixner, Scott, legendary gay rights activist and San Francisco City Councilman Harvey Milk, and others, Proposition 6 was defeated by over a million votes, the first ballot initiative of its sort to be shot down.

As a result of this huge success, Mixner and Scott experienced a huge upturn in business for their fledgling political consulting firm, Mixner/Scott, and were asked by Bill Clinton, then running for governor of Arkansas, to host a reception for Clinton at their Los Angeles home.

=== The Great Peace March for Global Nuclear Disarmament ===
In late 1984, after years of devastation in his personal life resulting from the AIDS crisis, Mixner decided to focus his energy on combating nuclear proliferation, creating an organization named PRO Peace. Mixner envisioned finding five thousand Americans who would take a year out of their lives to walk across America to advocate for disarmament, holding rallies throughout the country.

The Great Peace March for Global Nuclear Disarmament, which Mixner would later call his "biggest political failure and [his] biggest regret" ultimately left Los Angeles on March 1, 1986, with only 1200 marchers. The marchers reached as far as Barstow, California before unpaid debts to employees forced the group to a halt, leaving many in the group stranded. Two weeks later, 500 members of the group continued onwards and eventually reached Washington, D.C.

=== AIDS activism ===
Shortly after Mixner experienced professional success in 1985, helping defeat Proposition 64, a ballot initiative proposed by Lyndon LaRouche that would require quarantining people with AIDS, Mixner learned that his long-time friend and business partner, Peter Scott, had AIDS. Scott would fight the disease for four years; he died on May 13, 1989. While Scott fought the disease, Mixner formed an organization that spearheaded legislation that would create a California alternative to the FDA, enabling California to deal more aggressively with the AIDS epidemic than the federal government. Mixner's group enlisted the support of California Attorney General John Van de Kamp, then convinced California Governor George Deukmejian to sign AB 1952, which, as described by van de Kamp, "mandates the director of DHS to implement the drug testing and sale authority that he had under existing law, for the purpose of approving the testing and sale either of an AIDS vaccine, or of new drugs that offer a reasonable possibility of treating people who have been infected with the AIDS virus."

=== Clinton campaign and "Don’t Ask, Don’t Tell" ===
Four years after a fundraiser for the Dukakis campaign told Mixner that Massachusetts Governor Michael Dukakis would not accept the million dollars Mixner and his friends planned to raise for him, Mixner found hope in the candidacy of his old friend, Bill Clinton. He reportedly assisted Clinton in every election he took part in from 1974 up to the time leading to the White House. After Clinton promised Mixner that he would support both an end to the ban on gays in the military and increased funds to find a cure for AIDS, Mixner began raising money for Clinton enthusiastically. Mickey Kantor, Clinton's campaign chairman, soon asked Mixner to join the National Executive Committee of the Clinton for President campaign, the first openly-gay person to become a public face of a presidential campaign.

After Clinton was elected, Mixner helped with the transition team, though he publicly declared that he would not seek an appointment with the new administration. Although he spoke at an event at the inaugural ball, introduced by his old friend Ted Kennedy, Mixner soon thrust himself in the middle of the furor over the "Don’t Ask, Don’t Tell" policy proposed by Clinton, which represented a total betrayal to Mixner and many in the gay community. However, he also had angered the White House for attacking Senate Armed Services Committee chairman Sam Nunn, who in a speech Mixner referred to as an "old-fashioned bigot" for opposing Clinton's plan to lift the ban on gays in the military.

When Mixner went on Nightline to complain about Clinton's rapid shift away from allowing gays and lesbians to serve openly in the military, his calls to the White House stopped being returned and his consulting business began to decline, as he was no longer perceived as someone who had influence with the new administration.

Shortly thereafter, Mixner participated in a march in Washington for the Campaign for Military Service, which advocated lifting the bans on gays in the military. When Clinton announced the "Don’t Ask, Don’t Tell" policy on July 19, 1993, Mixner organized a march with CMS and was very publicly arrested outside the White House, for which he received a great deal of publicity because of his personal relationship with Clinton. Mixner and Clinton later healed the rift, but Clinton never again revisited the policy during his presidency.

== Later life ==
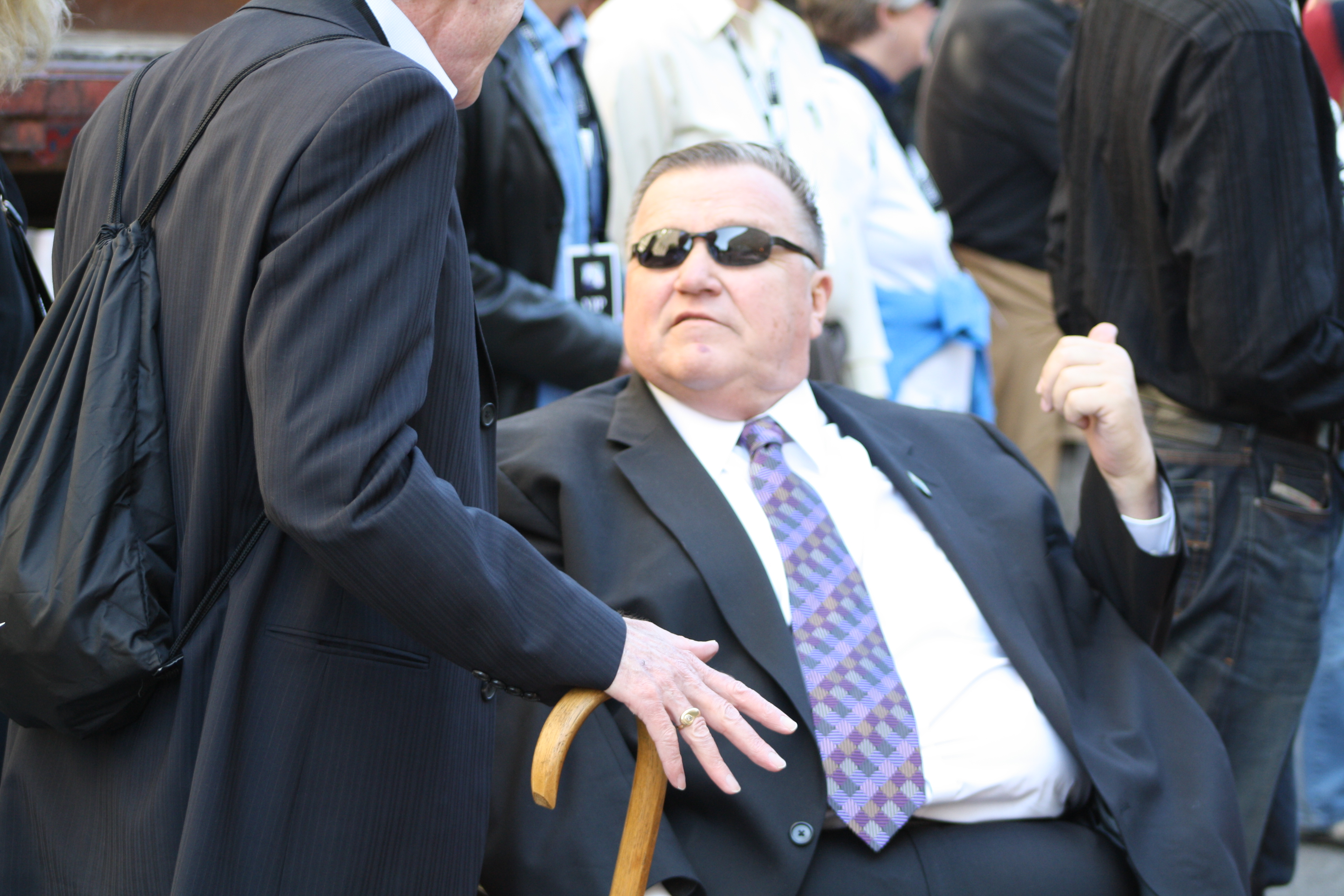
Mixner at the National Equality March Gathering Rally in 2009.

Despite his long history with Bill Clinton, Mixner would not support Hillary Clinton's 2008 presidential campaign, initially endorsing John Edwards before throwing his support to Barack Obama. Mixner stated that his endorsement of Edwards marked the first time he would oppose the Clintons in a political election.

In October 2008, Prime Minister Gordon Brown and his wife Sarah Brown honored Mixner with a luncheon at 10 Downing Street. The luncheon in Mixner's honor represented the first time a British Prime Minister honored an LGBTQ activist in this manner.

Mixner was featured in Ask Not, a 2008 documentary film about the "don't ask, don't tell" policy.

In May 2009, Mixner used his blog to call for a March on Washington to protest the LGBT community's lack of equal rights. Cleve Jones, spurred by Mixner's call to march, led the organizational efforts for the National Equality March, scheduled for October 10–11, 2009. Mixner and Jones both would be featured speakers at a rally in front of the Capitol after the March. Over 200,000 people marched on Washington on October 11, 2009.

Mixner was honored by the Point Foundation (LGBT), an organization that provides college scholarships to LGBTQ students, with its Legend Award at the foundation's 2009 Honors Gala in New York City. The award was presented to Mixner by Victoria Reggie Kennedy, the widow of Ted Kennedy.

In 2011, the Theater at Dixon Place announced a one-man show starring Mixner, From the Front Porch. The show is a benefit for Dixon Place and the Ali Forney Center, an organization benefiting LGBT homeless youth.

Mixner released a memoir of his time in Turkey Hollow, At Home with Myself: Stories from the Hills of Turkey Hollow, in September 2011. The memoir is published by Magnus Books.

In 2019, Mixner was the recipient of the Tyler Clementi Foundation's Individual Upstander Award.

=== Dunes of Overveen ===
In February 2014, The Hollywood Reporter announced that Alan Cumming acquired the rights to Dunes of Overveen, a script written by Mixner and Rich Burns about the true story of gay Dutch artist Willem Arondeus and the anti-Nazi uprising of artists he led in Amsterdam during World War II. Cumming has indicated he would star in the project, which is seeking a director.

=== The Mixner Trilogy ===
Mixner created three performance pieces that covered his life that have become known as the "Mixner Trilogy" in the Broadway Community. Among the performers who have appeared in these shows are Tony nominees Bobby Steggert and Rory O'Malley, Emily Swallow (The Mentalist), Chris Bolan (Mamma Mia!), Ryan Silverman (Mamma Mia! and Sideshow), country and western Singer Chely Wright, jazz saxophone great Dave Koz, Will Reynolds (actor/writer), Broadway legend T. Oliver Reid, Megan Ostrahause (Mary Poppins), and others.

==== Oh Hell No! ====
On October 27, 2014, Mixner premiered Oh Hell No! at New World Stages at 340 West 50th Street in New York. The autobiographical show, a one-night-only event to benefit the Point Foundation, featured Mixner revealing intensely personal details about the struggles he had faced, including the pain of losing 300 friends to AIDS in the 1980s. Due to the overwhelmingly positive reception the show received, Mixner was invited to revive the show for performances in Los Angeles and San Francisco in June 2015, with additional cities to follow. The stage production made its international debut at the Elfo Puccini Theatre in Milan on April 18, 2016.

==== 1969 ====
Mixner's original play 1969 was staged at the Florence Gould Hall Theater in New York City on March 6, 2017. Mixner takes theatre-goers back to the year 1969 where, along with Sam Brown, David Hawk, and Marge Sklencar, he created the Vietnam Moratorium, which involved protests against the Vietnam War on October 15 and November 15 of that year. Until the Women's March in 2017, it was the largest march in the history of the United States. In 1969, Mixner revealed the deep personal struggle of being a closeted gay man in that time and a blackmail attempt that threatened to out him. In addition, he tells stories about Richard Nixon, Henry Kissinger, John Dean and others in the production. At the end, Sam Brown, and David Hawk joined Mixner on stage, the first time they appeared on a stage together in 47 years.

==== Who Fell Into The Outhouse? ====
On March 5, 2018, Mixner performed the last show of his trilogy again to sold-out audiences. This time Mixner took folks back to his childhood, telling stories of poverty, segregation, murder, and rising from the ashes. It was his most personal and vulnerable work of the three productions. The production raised $175,000 for homeless LGBTQ youth.

=== Jacob's Ladder ===
In March 2015, Jacob’s Ladder, a play written by Mixner and Dennis Bailey, debuted at the Boyd Vance Theatre at the George Washington Carver Museum and Cultural Center in Austin, Texas. The play, a historical drama set during World War II, concerns a Jewish White House aide's discovery of a secret proposal to bomb Hitler's Concentration Camps in Eastern Europe. Directed by Derek Kolluri, the show debuted to positive reviews.

=== Pride Talk Amsterdam ===
On July 20, 2023, Mixner was the keynote speaker of the first edition of the Pride Talk Amsterdam. An annual talk in the run up to Pride Amsterdam, organised by The New Church on Dam Square in Amsterdam, The Netherlands. Mixner's speech, filled with emotion, humor, melancholy and hope, was immortalized in a manifesto. Mixner was introduced by the president of COC Netherlands, Astrid Oosenbrug, and member of the Senate & human rights activist Boris Dittrich.

== Death and funeral ==
Mixner died from long COVID at his home in Midtown Manhattan, New York City, on March 11, 2024, at the age of 77. His funeral was held on March 25, 2024, at the St. Paul the Apostle Catholic Church in Manhattan. New Jersey Governor Phil Murphy gave the eulogy. President Joe Biden, who was unable to attend the service, sent two top gay aides, Gautam Raghavan and Jamie Citron, in his place. The actress Michelle Clunie also spoke at the funeral. Mixner is buried in Potter's Field on Hart Island.

== Honors and legacy ==
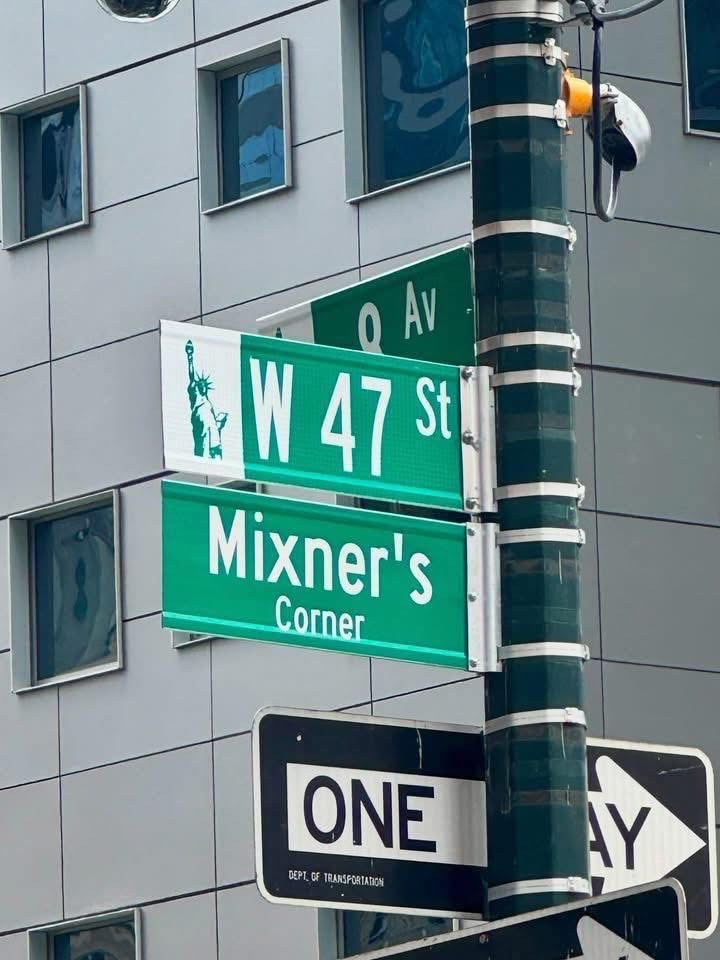
Mixner's Corner in New York City

On May 16, 2015, Washington College awarded Mixner an honorary doctorate for his "lifetime in the forefront of American politics and international human rights, championing LGBTQ equality, wildlife conservation and progressive political causes." Dr. Mixner also delivered the commencement address to the graduating class of 2015.

In 2021, the Institute of Current World Affairs and trustee Fabrice Houdart set up the David Mixner LGBTQ+ Writing Fellowship for young writers to immerse themselves in a specific LGBTQ+ issue abroad. That same year, Mixner was inducted into the New Jersey Hall of Fame.

In June 2025, a streetcorner at West 47th Street and 8th Avenue in Manhattan, New York City was named Mixner's Corner in honor of David Mixner.

== Books ==
- Mixner, David B. (1996). Stranger Among Friends. New York: Bantam Books. ISBN 9780553100730. OCLC 34798204. A memoir.
- Mixner, David B.; Bailey, Dennis (2000). Brave Journeys: Profiles in Gay and Lesbian Courage. New York: Bantam Books. ISBN 9780553106510. OCLC 43641137.
- Mixner, David B. (2011). At Home with Myself: Stories from the Hills of Turkey Hollow. New York: Magnus Books. ISBN 9781936833108. OCLC 770822162. Mixner's second memoir.
