= List of VISTA volunteers =

Notable people who served as members with the Volunteers in Service to America program include the following:

- Alurista, poet and activist
- Paul H. Anderson, Minnesota Supreme Court justice; attorney for VISTA
- James R. Benn
- Howard Berman
- Rhonda Berry
- David Blankenhorn
- Peter C. Brinckerhoff
- Beano Cook, Sportscaster
- Carl Gershman (1965–1967; Pittsburgh, Pennsylvania), President of the National Endowment for Democracy since 1984
- Larry Gossett
- Eula Hall
- Richard P. (Dick) Haugland
- Michael Hennessy, San Francisco sheriff
- Charniele Herring, member of the Virginia House of Delegates
- Patricia D. Jehlen, Massachusetts state senator
- Margo Jennings, running coach
- Colbert I. King
- Douglas Kirby
- Tom Kolwiecki, fictional character in Denise Giardina's novel The Unquiet Earth
- Thomas A Kramer (Kansas City, Kansas ) 1970-1972 Vista Leader 1972 founder of Kramer Video Inc, Seattle, WA
- Gerry Larson
- Susan Lish
- Ki Longfellow, author; VISTA volunteer on the Blackfeet Indian reservation
- William Luvaas
- Ray Magliozzi, former host of Car Talk
- James H. Maloney
- George R. R. Martin
- John Medinger, Wisconsin State Assembly and Mayor of La Crosse, Wisconsin
- Alan Meisner
- Charles E. F. Millard
- Gwen Moore
- Mary Murphy
- Hill Pickus
- James H. Rathlesberger
- Irwin Redlener
- Emilie Richards
- Eugene Richards
- Jay Rockefeller, U.S. Senator
- Tweed Roosevelt
- John Singer (Faygele Ben-Miriam) (mid 1960s, St. Louis), U.S. LGBT rights activist
- Ted Smith
- James Sokolove
- John Thorn (served 1966-1967 on the Crow Indian Reservation in Montana)
- Peterson Zah
