= Sam Brown (activist) =

American anti-war activist, politician, and government official (born 1943)

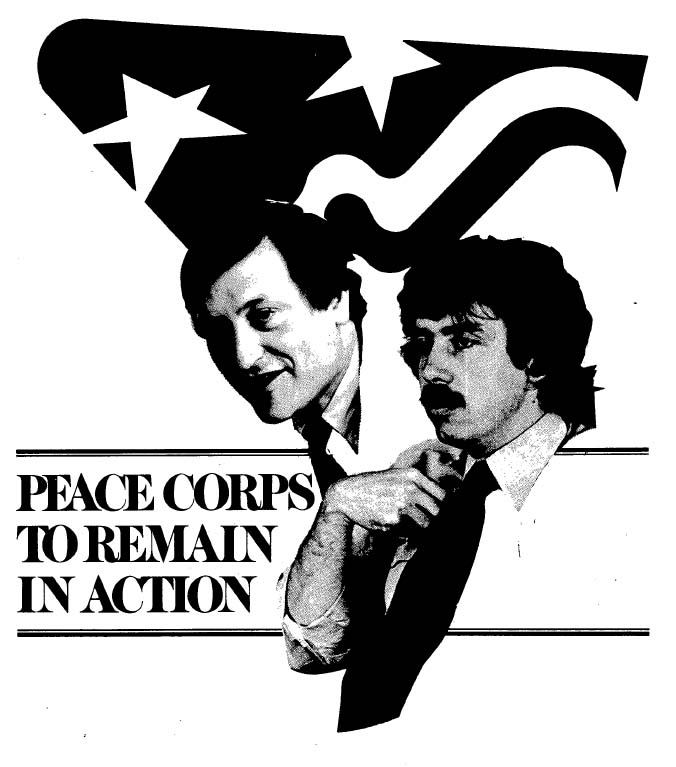
The cover of "Action Update" (August 16, 1979) showing Sam Brown (right), the Director of the Action Corps which administered the Peace Corps, Volunteers in Service to America (VISTA) and other service programs. Richard Celeste (left) was appointed Peace Corps director after the resignation of Peace Corps Director Carolyn Payton.

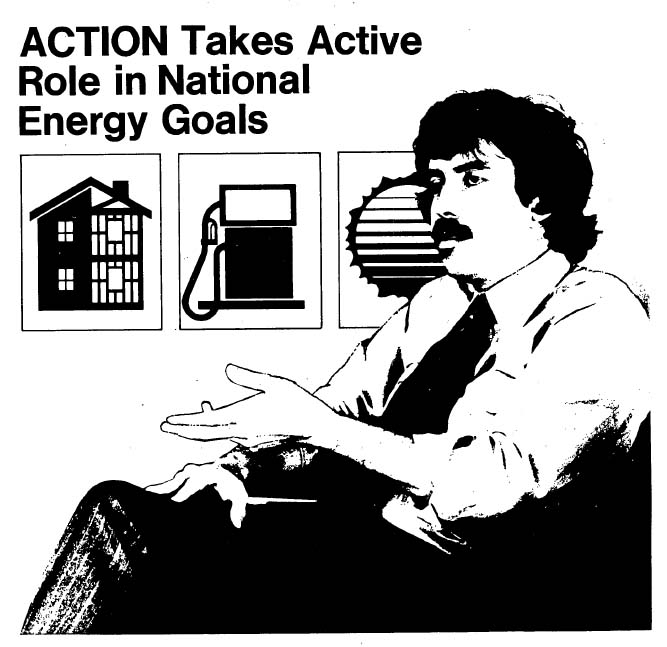
The cover of "Action Update" (September 30, 1979) depicting Sam Brown, who was appointed Director of the Action Corps by President Jimmy Carter in 1977. One of Brown's initiatives as Action director was to have VISTA workers support Carter's energy conservation policies.

Sam W. Brown Jr. (born July 27, 1943) is a former political activist, the head of ACTION under President Jimmy Carter, and ambassador to the Organization for Security and Cooperation in Europe.

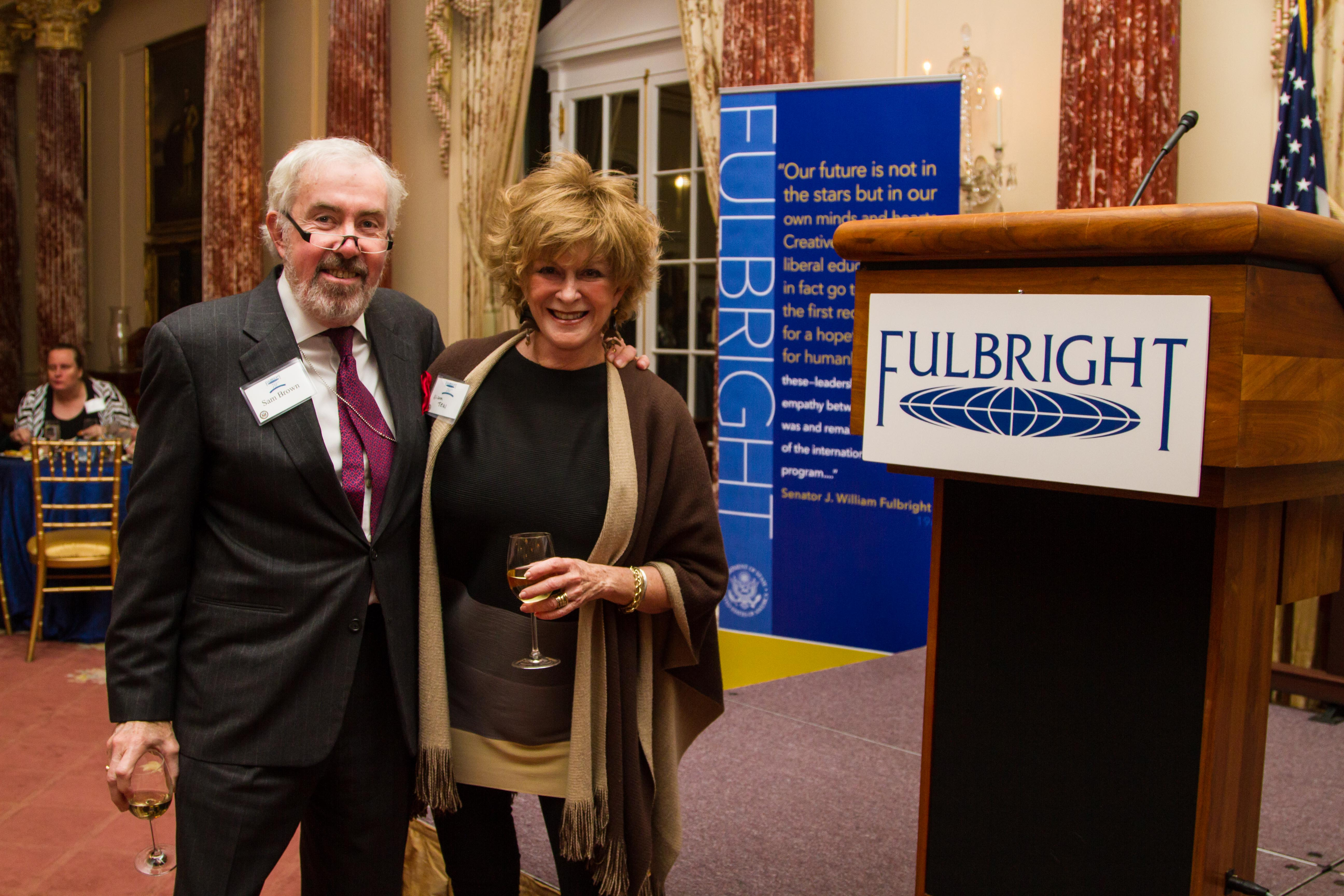

== Early life and education ==
Sam W. Brown Jr. was born July 27, 1943, in Council Bluffs, Iowa. He attended Abraham Lincoln High School in Council Bluffs where he was, in his own words, "the outstanding ROTC cadet." In his childhood, he wrote, "it never occurred to me that America could be wrong." Brown attended the University of Redlands in California, where he was first the president of the young Republicans and then the student body president. In 1967 Brown was the chairman of the National Student Association's national supervisory board. In 1967 Brown ran for president of the National Student Association and lost. Brown received a B.A. from the University of Redlands in 1965, an M.A. from Rutgers University in 1966, pursued graduate studies at Harvard University Divinity School from 1966–1968, and was a Fellow at the John F. Kennedy Institute of Politics, Harvard University, in 1969.

== National Student Association spokesman during CIA scandal ==
In 1967, Ramparts magazine reported that the CIA had been using the National Student Association (NSA) for intelligence gathering abroad. As revealed by the president of the organization, Philip Sherburne, in a conversation with the organization's finance director, Michael Wood, the CIA had been funneling money to the organization through various charity fronts in exchange for covert cooperation from students in the NSA's international programs. As spokesman for the national NSA's national supervisory board, Brown was particularly appalled by the predicament of members of the NSA's international programs: "The fantastic pressures these people were under were simply incomprehensible to me... The agony of these people who were trapped and were unable to break this relationship was awful." Brown said that the supervisory board had no knowledge of the CIA's involvement until it was reported, announced that the NSA would assist in any investigation of the CIA's role, and said, "The United States Government owes an unconditional apology to the N.S.A. for using the N.S.A. in this duplicitous manner."

== Anti-war organizer ==
=== Vietnam Summer ===
Brown first got involved in organizing during "Vietnam Summer" in 1967 when five hundred paid staffers and twenty-six thousand volunteers organized hundreds of grass roots antiwar projects. Brown was one of the volunteers who gained valuable experience during Vietnam Summer. "I know the first time that I ever went and knocked on somebody's door and waited for them to answer so that could tell them that I wanted to talk to them about the war was not an easy moment," said Brown. Brown said that the volunteers gained valuable organizing skills that he and others would later apply during Eugene McCarthy's presidential bid. "To some extent the McCarthy campaign couldn't have happened without that," said Brown.

=== Youth Coordinator for McCarthy for President ===
Brown was the youth coordinator for Senator Eugene J. McCarthy's Presidential campaign. According to Tom Wells in his book The War Within Brown would sometimes entertain the notion that McCarthy could win the nomination "sometimes for up to thirty minutes at a stretch." The campaign's main appeal for Brown was that "it gave an opportunity and gave an excuse to walk up to people's doors and say, 'Hi. I'm Sam Brown. I'm here because I'd like to talk to you about the war in Vietnam - and about Gene McCarthy.'" Brown hoped that the McCarthy campaign would show people that protesters were "not some crazy minority."

In 2008 Brown's wife, Alison Teal, wrote about Brown's role at the 1968 Democratic Convention. "In 1968, my husband Sam was the liaison between the McCarthy campaign and the protesters and was eventually a defense witness at the Trial of the Chicago Seven," wrote Teal. "Within the leadership of the 1968 convention, there were agents provocateurs from the Chicago police and the FBI."

Brown says that hard work is the secret for being a successful organizer. "You have to be willing to work for very long hours for very little remuneration," says Brown. "But there's a great psychic remuneration." "Sam has three great qualities," said a friend in 1969. "He is willing to work every minute of every day. He is calm in the most tense crises. And he is a terribly, terribly nice, sweet person." Brown said in 1969 that organizing is what he does best and that he does not want to become a celebrity. "The worst thing that can happen to an organizer is to become identified as a leader," said Brown. "There's a terrific antileadership bias in the country now."

=== Coordinator for the Vietnam Moratorium Committee ===
In April 1969 while Brown was a graduate student in ethics at Harvard Divinity School, Jerome Grossman came to Brown with the idea for a nationwide strike to protest the war in Vietnam. Brown liked the idea but suggested that instead of calling it a strike, that it be called a moratorium. In June 1969 Brown moved to Washington and set up the office of the Vietnam Moratorium Committee. David E. Rosenbaum wrote in the New York Times in 1969 that Brown "is a young man with a genius for organizing who has been the prime mover behind the Vietnam Moratorium protests."

As part of organizing the moratorium, the group ran three full page advertisements in the New York Times for a total cost of $26,328. Brown drew a salary from the moratorium committee of $75 a week. One of Brown's roles in organizing the Moratorium was fund raising which Brown called "the most demeaning thing there is." Nonetheless Brown went on fund raising trips and appeared on television as the moratorium's spokesman. Brown brought his contact lists from the McCarthy campaign with him to work on the Moratorium. "Lists are the guts of organizing," says Brown. Brown's lists included people who had contributed to liberal causes in the past, community organizers, and a list of faculty members who had signed antiwar advertisements.

On October 15, 1969 an estimated two million people took part in the moratorium in what may have been the largest US demonstration of all time.

On November 15, 1969 a crowd estimated at 250,000 had a massive demonstration at the Washington Monument. After the November 15 demonstration the energy in the movement seemed to dissipate. Observers attributed the apathy to President Nixon's November 3 speech in which he outlined his plan for "Vietnamization" of the Vietnam war. Brown called Nixon's speech "a tremendous political coup by managing to identify himself with the cause of peace." The organizers said that the demonstrations had been at least a partial success and took some credit for Nixon's troop withdrawals and the dismissal of the head of Selective Service, General Lewis B. Hershey. The New York Times reported that the committee was $100,000 in debt. Brown said he hoped to make up the deficit through several "peace concerts."

The Moratorium Committee announced on April 19, 1970 that it was disbanding and the organizers said that money had dried up and the "political fad" of large demonstrations had run its course. The four national coordinators including Brown said that they each planned to continue antiwar activities on their own. Brown said that he planned to write a manual on how to organize. "You'd be surprised how many people don't know how to draw up a telephone tree, set up an office, call a press conference," said Brown. "I want to tell them how to do this."

=== Storefront Organizing: A Mornin' Glories' Manual ===
In 1972 Brown published Storefront Organizing: A Mornin' Glories' Manual. Brown dedicated the book to Jesse Unruh "who taught me the importance of organization" and to Gene McCarthy who showed Brown that "there are some things worth organizing for." The book is a compendium of some of the basics of organizing "to help and encourage people who want to organize." Brown doesn't claim the book s definitive because "imagination and inventiveness are the prime ingredients of organizing." Brown says he wrote the book to be effective regardless of one's ideological point of view. However, Brown states that "the bias is against the status quo, rather than for it" because "the few have always been well organized, the many have never been organized and have never had a voice. Grassroots organization is the way to change that." Brown's book contains the nuts and bolts of grassroots organizing including discussion of such topics as establishing a storefront, finding support in your community, planning programs, getting out crowds, handling the press, fundraising, planning rallies, and canvassing and getting out the vote.

=== Post-organizing activities ===
Brown worked as a consultant for the FUND for Neighborhood Development from 1972-1973. Brown was Vice President of Brown's Better Shoes from 1970 to 1974.

=== Election as treasurer of Colorado ===
Brown was elected state treasurer of Colorado and served in the position from 1975 to 1977.

== ACTION director ==
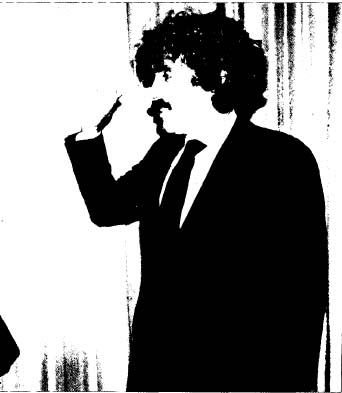
Sam Brown was appointed director of the Action by President Jimmy Carter in 1977.

Brown was appointed Director of ACTION by President Jimmy Carter in 1977. Anthony Lake, a member of president Carter's transition committee, recalled "Sam was very good at pushing his point of view with sufficient flexibility so he could make deals and stick with them. He has very deeply held and decent principles, but he is practical enough to move them along." Action Corps had been created in 1971 by President Richard Nixon to administer the Peace Corps, Volunteers in Service to America and other service programs.

=== Changes in ACTION mission ===
Seven months into his tenure as ACTION director, Brown released a blueprint for change, declaring "the mission of Action is to mobilize people for voluntary action at home and abroad to change the conditions that deny fulfillment of human needs by calling on the best and most creative instincts of the human spirit." Brown's outline for the new direction of the organization included:

- VISTA volunteers were to reemphasize community organizing and advocacy.
- Decision-making in VISTA programs would be controlled by local offices rather than state or regional ones.
- There would be a workplace democracy program within ACTION
- The peace corps would refocus on "basic human needs."

=== Appointment and resignation of Carolyn Payton and surrounding controversy ===
After a five-month search for a new director of the peace corps, in which Brown offered the job to Rafer Johnson, then-representative Ron Dellums of California, Jane Hart – the widow of former Senator Philip Hart – and LaDonna Harris, Brown appointed Carolyn Payton as director of the Peace Corps.

Brown clashed with Payton from the start. And after only thirteen months in the position, in November 1979, Brown asked for her resignation. She initially agreed to resign, then withdrew her resignation and issued a statement that implied she would not leave unless asked directly by president Carter, who asked for her resignation shortly thereafter. Payton cited, in part, policy differences between ACTION and the Peace Corps saying "as Director, I could not, because of the peculiar administrative structure under which the Peace Corps operates, do anything about this situation. As an ex-director, I am free to sound the alarm."

Future congressman John Lewis, then the associate director of ACTION under Brown, wrote that the conflict between Brown and Payton was entirely over policy: "The resignation of Carolyn Payton stemmed from regrettable – but nonetheless honest and unreconcilable – differences with the administration concerning policy and philosophy.

==== Controversy after Payton's resignation ====
Many of the policy issues between Payton and Brown were revealed after her resignation. Brown for example announced that the Peace Corps would only work in the poorest countries based on GNP and announced that the Peace Corps would pull out of countries that did not meet its criteria for aid. Peace Corps Director Payton responded that "Whether or not we could find satisfactory jobs for volunteers was a better criteria than how much money a country has ... It's offensive to me to tell a host country what their needs are."

According to Payton, Brown wanted to "send volunteers for short periods to developing countries and then bring back the skills they had learned to fight poverty in the United States". She also claimed that Brown's policy went against the original goals of the Peace Corps and said that Brown was "trying to turn the corps into an arrogant, elitist political organization intended to meddle in the affairs of foreign governments."

In 1994, during the confirmation hearings for Brown's later ambassadorship to the CSCE, Payton's resignation was interpreted in two very different ways by his supporters and opponents. According to the 44 Senators who later rejected the motion for cloture on Brown's appointment as ambassador to the CSCE (the Senators who opposed his nomination), Brown was undiplomatic and unjustified in dismissing Payton. They claimed, that Payton's differences with Brown ended in an argument during a trip to Morocco, when Brown openly berated Dr. Payton before Action Corps officials and Brown's "attacks culminated with a midnight phone-call demanding her resignation, which she refused to give, after which he went to her hotel room and pounded on her door for a full fifteen minutes, demanding to be let in to continue his harassment".

According to those 56 Senators in support of the cloture motion (and, presumably, of Brown's nomination):

Criticisms of Mr. Brown's performance at this agency are unfounded. In the 1970s, Senator Simon (who was then Representative Simon), held extensive hearings on the operation of the ACTION Agency. A few problems were uncovered, but they were long-standing problems that were eventually corrected by Mr. Brown, and the hearings produced no direct criticism of his performance. The final result of those hearings was that Congress decided he was doing an exemplary job, and it increased the agency's budget by 20 percent.

=== Appointment of Richard Celeste as Peace Corps Director and internal restructuring ===
After Payton's resignation, Richard Celeste was appointed the new Peace Corps Director on April 27, 1979. According to P. David Searles in his book the Peace Corps Experience: "Under Celeste the agency was given considerable autonomy to direct its own affairs," wrote Searles, "although strictly speaking it remained under the Action umbrella."

== Between 1981 and 1994 ==
=== Work in private sector ===
Brown has been General Partner of Centennial Partners, Limited, a real estate development firm with offices in Colorado and California, since 1981.

=== Support for First Gulf War ===
The New York Times reported in 1991 that Brown said that force could be necessary to restore stability in the Middle East and keep nuclear weapons from the hands of Saddam Hussein. "It's a real odd thing for an old anti-war person to be thinking, but there are wars and there are wars," said Brown. "Every time I hear a parallel to Vietnam, I blanch. I see the movement people gearing up, the same familiar faces, and I want to say, 'Hold on, hold on.' It's a wholly different situation that needs to be analyzed on its own merits."

== Head of delegation to the CSCE and OSCE ==
Margaret Carlson reported in Time Magazine in 1994 that President Clinton had appointed Brown Ambassador to the Conference on Security and Cooperation in Europe (CSCE), a 52-nation organization in Vienna that mediates conflicts in the former Soviet republics and promotes human rights, and that the Senate Foreign Relations Committee had held hearings on Brown on November 18, 1993 and approved his nomination by a vote of 11 to 9. Before Brown's nomination could come to a Senate vote, Republicans Jesse Helms of North Carolina and Hank Brown of Colorado sent Brown a barrage of over 100 questions including why Brown had dropped a requirement that Peace Corps volunteers be instructed in the menace of communism and whether Brown had thrown any objects, "including human feces," at the 1968 Democratic Convention. "No one understands why Hank Brown has decided to make Sam Brown his nemesis," wrote Carlson. "Some think Hank Brown simply wants to zing the President, refight the Vietnam War and triumph over an old rival. (Sam Brown was treasurer of Colorado; Hank Brown was a member of the state legislature.)"

Brown's supporters were unable to overcome a Republican-led filibuster against giving ambassadorial rank to Brown and President Clinton went ahead with Brown's appointment without senate approval. Brown served as the Head of Delegation, without the rank of ambassador, to the US Mission to the OSCE in Vienna. On November 17, 1997, President Clinton awarded Brown the personal rank of Ambassador in his capacity as the Head of Delegation to the 1997 OSCE Ministerial Preparatory conferences, an appointment that does not require Senate confirmation.

As head of delegation Brown defended the CSCE as an alternative to NATO in shaping European security. "The CSCE is the natural multilateral forum, as the trans-Atlantic institution where Russia has an equal voice, for work on these questions. This is not war and peace in the traditional sense, but instability around Russia's borders. It's very different from what NATO does," said Brown. "The CSCE doesn't have guns and is not going to have. It doesn't have the strength of NATO's unanimity. But NATO isn't equipped to handle some things we do."

Brown's tenure at the OSCE was greeted enthusiastically by his fellow representatives. Christos Botzios, the Greek Ambassador to the OSCE, said "He has added enormously to the prestige of the United States, as a country that cares about cooperation ... I think all my colleagues would agree with me."

== Later career ==
=== Executive director of the Fair Labor Association (FLA) ===
The Fair Labor Association (FLA) named Brown their Executive Director in January 2000. The Fair Labor Association is a non-profit organization designed to complement existing international and national labor laws that was created in 1999 after President Bill Clinton recognized the need for supervision over the apparel industry regarding issues of human rights.

=== Role in 2004 election ===
Brown worked to raise funds for John Kerry in the 2004 election and was not happy about the debate over Kerry's service in Vietnam. "I'm really upset that we're stuck on Vietnam," he said, "but what really appalls me is that unlike 1968, when there was a real clash of ideas, this year we hear nothing from either candidate - not Bush, not Kerry - about what they propose to do to extract us from this awful mess in Iraq." Thirty-six years after the idealism that produced the McCarthy insurgency, Brown said, "I see nasty, mean-spirited politics on all sides, the equivalent of the kind of scrum you see in the Chicago commodities pits."

The Los Angeles Times reported that Brown and his wife Alison Teal raised about $800,000 for the Kerry campaign including about $300,000 in "ideological money" from the East Bay area. Brown and his wife raised funds by hosting house parties for Kerry, seeking donations from strangers on the grocery line, and soliticiting from Teal's online blog.

== Personal life ==
He married Alison Valentine Teal, born in 1945 in Omaha, Douglas County, Nebraska, the only daughter of Clarence W. Teal and Valentine Moline. Her mother, a 1924 graduate of Smith College, was a novelist, short story writer, publisher of three novels, and also contributed short stories to several magazines such as the Saturday Evening Post and Child's Life. Both of her parents were long time active volunteers of the Omaha Community Playhouse which was founded by Dodie Brando, mother of actor Marlon Brando. The Clarence Teal Cameo Award, which recognizes exceptional performances in a cameo role, was named for him.

She is a 1966 graduate of Smith College, Northampton, Massachusetts. She is a writer/photographer and a frequent political contributor on the Huffington Post as well as her own blog site.

Brown met Teal in 1968 while he was a leader of the "Get Clean for Gene" McCarthy student movement, being a youth coordinator for Senator Eugene McCarthy's Presidential campaign in 1968.

They are the parents of three children: Nicholas Teal Brown, an aspiring writer, actor, and political activist; Teal Valentine Brown, a UN Foundation researcher, Aspen Ideas Festival coordinator, actor, and public policy student; and Dr Willa Hammitt Brown, an author and graduate of Oxford and the University of Virginia.

Brown lives in modernized log cabin on the shores of silvery Deer Lake 85 miles south of the Canada–US border at International Falls. In 2004, Brown said that he once dreamed of being a senator.

Political offices
Preceded by Palmer Burch	State Treasurer of Colorado; 1975–1977	Succeeded by Roy Romer
Preceded by Position created	United States Ambassador to the Organization for Security and Cooperation in Europe; 1994–1997	Succeeded by David T. Johnson
