= Carolyn R. Payton =

Director of the United States Peace Corps

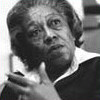

8th Director of the Peace Corps
- In office October 11, 1977 – December 18, 1978
- President: Jimmy Carter
- Preceded by: John Dellenback
- Succeeded by: Richard F. Celeste

Personal details
- Born: May 13, 1925 Norfolk, Virginia, U.S.
- Died: April 11, 2001 (aged 75) Washington, DC, U.S.
- Education: Bennett College (BA); University of Wisconsin (MS); Columbia University (EdD)

Carolyn Robertson Payton (May 13, 1925 – April 11, 2001) was appointed Director of the United States Peace Corps in 1977 by President Jimmy Carter. She was the first female and the first African American to be Peace Corps Director. Payton was a pioneer in black women's leadership within the American Psychological Association and psychology.

== Early life and education ==
She was born Carolyn Robertson in Norfolk, Virginia in 1925. Her father, Leroy Solomon Robertson, was a chef and her mother, Bertha Flanagan Robertson, a seamstress and homemaker. Payton came from a close knit family that emphasized the value of education. Her grandfather, although born into slavery, saw to it that all of his children attended college. Payton's father enrolled her at Bennett College in Greensboro, North Carolina, in 1941 majoring in home economics and graduated in 1945. Payton said that Bennett, a small historically Black women's college, shaped her aspirations, attitudes, and expectations and gave her a sense of her capabilities as a woman. She remained close to Bennett College during her entire life and established a scholarship fund there in the late 1990s.

Payton transferred to the University of Wisconsin–Madison for her M.S. degree in clinical psychology in 1948. Under the "separate-but-equal" doctrine, the state of Virginia covered her expenses at the out-of-state school because she pursued a graduate degree in a discipline available to White students at a White state schools, but unavailable to Blacks at a Black state school. Payton conducted her masters thesis on the then newly developed Wechsler-Bellevue Test of Intelligence and concluded that the test provided an inaccurate measure of the true ability of Blacks.

While at the University of Wisconsin–Madison, Payton married Raymond Rudolph Payton, a police detective, but the marriage lasted less than four years and the two divorced in 1951. Payton began taking summer courses at Columbia University's teachers college in 1952 and received her Ed.D. in counseling and student administration in 1962.

== Academic career ==
Payton began her first job as an instructor in psychology at Livingstone College in Salisbury, North Carolina in 1948 and worked there for five years. In 1953 she became Dean of Women and a psychology instructor at Elizabeth City State Teachers College (now Elizabeth City State University) in North Carolina. In 1956, Payton became an associate professor of psychology at Virginia State College in Petersburg, Virginia. Payton was appointed an assistant professor in psychology at Howard University in 1959.

After leaving the Peace Corps in 1978, Payton returned to Howard University where she was appointed Dean of Counseling and Career Development and later Director of University Counseling Services. As Dean she helped develop an internship-training center. Payton retired from Howard in 1995.

== Peace Corps ==
=== Staff member ===
Payton started at the Peace Corps as a field assignment officer in 1964 helping prepare trainees to serve in West Africa. Payton traveled extensively for the Peace Corps performing psychological tests, interviews, clinical observations and peer reviews to help determine the conditions that would lead to the most satisfying experience for Peace Corps volunteers. In 1966 she was appointed Deputy Country Director for the Caribbean and in 1967 was appointed as Country Director for the Caribbean region supervising 130 volunteers involved in education projects on eight islands in the eastern Caribbean. At the time she was one of two women who were country directors.

=== Director ===
Payton was appointed Director of the Peace Corps by President Jimmy Carter in 1977. As Peace Corps Director Payton clashed with Sam Brown, Director of ACTION, which had been created in 1971 by President Richard Nixon to administer the Peace Corps, Volunteers in Service to America and other service programs. Brown wanted to "send volunteers for short periods to developing countries and then bring back the skills they had learned to fight poverty in the United States". According to Payton, Brown's policy went against the original goals of the Peace Corps and said that Brown was "trying to turn the corps into an arrogant, elitist political organization intended to meddle in the affairs of foreign governments." According to Senate testimony Payton's differences with Brown ended in an argument during a trip to Morocco, when Brown openly berated Payton before Action Corps officials and later went to her hotel room and pounded on her door for fifteen minutes, demanding to be let in to continue his harassment.

Payton resigned in 1978 after thirteen months as Director citing, in part, policy differences between ACTION and the Peace Corps saying "as Director, I could not, because of the peculiar administrative structure under which the Peace Corps operates, do anything about this situation. As an ex-director, I am free to sound the alarm." After Payton's resignation, President Carter issued an executive order taking the Peace Corps out from under ACTION and making it a fully autonomous agency.

=== Continued connection ===
Payton retained her connection to the Peace Corps. In 1981, she spoke about the contribution that volunteers had made around the world, "I think the whole idea of Peace Corps was brought home to me most recently last summer, when there was a terribly damaging hurricane in the Caribbean. Some of the Volunteers who had served with me there were collecting food, clothes and money to send back to the Islanders. Those Volunteers had left the Islands in 1967, but they still had a concern and care about those Islanders. That's what I think is at the heart of the Peace Corps, and that's why the Peace Corps is relevant today." Payton was awarded the Peace Corps Leader for Peace Award in 1988. In 2000, Payton attended the swearing in ceremony for Peace Corps Director Mark L. Schneider.

== Professional activities and awards ==
Payton was very active in the American Psychological Association (APA) and served on many committees and task forces including the Committee on Scientific and Professional Ethics and Conduct, the Task Force on Sex Bias and Sex Role Stereotyping in Psychotherapeutic Practice, the Committee on Women in Psychology, the Committee on Lesbian and Gay Concerns, and the Policy and Planning Board. Payton was made a fellow of APA in 1987. She also won the Distinguished Professional Contributions to Public Service Award from APA in 1982. In 1985, the APA Committee on Women in Psychology Leadership Citation Award honored her for her role as "an outstanding teacher, role model, and mentor for women and ethnic minorities. She has provided leadership on ethical and consumer issues in psychology and in eliminating sex bias in psychotherapeutic practice...her commitment to equality and justice for all oppressed peoples has made a precious difference in all our lives." In 1997, Payton received the APA Award for Outstanding Lifetime Contribution to Psychology for her "dedication to using psychology to promote better cross-cultural understanding and to end social injustice by influencing political process...[Her] success in overcoming gender and racial barriers to achieve positions of leadership and prestige make [her] a role model to women and ethnic minorities everywhere."

== Citations ==
Government offices
Preceded by John Dellenback	Director of the Peace Corps; 1977–1978	Succeeded by Richard F. Celeste
