= Senior Resources of Guilford =

Nonprofit organization for older adults based in North Carolina

Senior Resources of Guilford, based in Greensboro and High Point, North Carolina, is a nonprofit organization providing home-based and community-based services that support and promote independent living for older adults. The agency is a community partner of the United Way of Greater Greensboro and the United Way of High Point, and is also a member of the Piedmont Triad Regional Council Area Agency on Aging. Senior Resources of Guilford provides a range of services including information and referral, case assistance, non-emergency medical transportation, nutritional programs (congregate and Mobile Meals), support to family caregivers, and volunteer opportunities. The agency's Executive Director is Ellen Whitlock. Senior Resources of Guilford was founded in 1977 as United Services for Older Adults, changing its name to Senior Resources in 2001. The agency operates numerous programs, including Foster Grandparents. Senior Resources is a member of Senior Corps, and locally administers the federal Foster Grandparents program. The agency also operates an annual Santa for Seniors program. Senior Resources is accredited with the Alliance of Information and Referral Systems (AIRS), and its Evergreens Lifestyle Center Senior Center is a North Carolina Senior Center of Excellence.

The agency's Greensboro office is located at 1401 Benjamin Parkway, Greensboro, North Carolina. Senior Resources also maintains an office at the Roy B. Culler, Jr. Senior Center on 600 North Hamilton Street in High Point, North Carolina.
