= Peter C. Brinckerhoff =

American writer

Peter Corlies Brinckerhoff
- Born: May 4, 1952 (age 74); Hartford, Connecticut
- Education: Bachelor's Degree, University of Pennsylvania; Master's Degree in Public Health Administration, Tulane University
- Occupations: Author, trainer, consultant
- Spouse: Christine
- Children: Ben, Adam and Caitlin
- Writing career
- Notable awards: Three Terry McAdam Awards for Best New Nonprofit Book
- Website: www.missionbased.com

Peter Corlies Brinckerhoff is a trainer, writer, and consultant on nonprofit management.

== Early life ==
Raised in Connecticut, Brinckerhoff received his bachelor's degree from the University of Pennsylvania, and his master's degree in Public Health Administration from Tulane University. After two years volunteering with Volunteers in Service to America (VISTA), followed by graduate school, Brinckerhoff served as a staff member and Executive Director of the West Central Illinois Health Systems Agency. In 1982, he formed Corporate Alternatives, Inc., a consulting and training company working with 501(c)(3) (non-profit) organizations. From 1979 to the present, Brinckerhoff has served on the board of directors for many local, state, national and international nonprofits.

== Work ==
Brinckerhoff has written seven books and two workbooks about nonprofit management, and has had around 60 articles published in the not-for-profit press. Three of his books, Mission-Based Management (1994), Financial Empowerment (1996) and Generations, The Challenge of a Lifetime for Your Nonprofit (2007), were awarded the Terry McAdam Award from the Alliance for Nonprofit Management, given each year to the "Best New Nonprofit Book". Brinckerhoff is the only author to win the award multiple times. Brinckerhoff's books are used as texts in courses at undergraduate and graduate nonprofit management programs in over 100 colleges and universities worldwide.

Brinckerhoff is also a speaker and lecturer on the topic of nonprofit management, publishes the monthly online Mission-Based Management Newsletter, and maintains the Mission-Based Management blog.

From 2003 to 2007, Brinckerhoff served as Adjunct Professor of Nonprofit Management at the Kellogg School of Management at Northwestern University, where he taught the core graduate course in the Nonprofit Management program. He has also guest lectured at the graduate level at Boston University, University of Colorado, University of Illinois, and Vanderbilt University.

== Personal life ==
Brinckerhoff and his family lived in Springfield, Illinois from 1977-2007. He and his wife now live in Union Hall, Virginia.

== Bibliography ==
- Mission-Based Management: Leading Your Nonprofit in the 21st Century. New York: John Wiley & Sons (1994). 2nd Edition, 2000, 3rd Edition due out late 2009. ISBN 978-0-471-39013-8
- Financial Empowerment: An Essential Financial Guide for Not-for-Profit Organizations. New York: John Wiley & Sons (1996). ISBN 978-0-471-29692-8
- Mission-Based Marketing: Positioning Your Not-for-Profit in an Increasingly Competitive World. New York: John Wiley & Sons (1997). 2nd Edition, 2003. ISBN 978-0-471-23718-1
- Faith Based Management: Leading Organizations That Are About More Than Just Mission. New York: John Wiley & Sons (1999). ISBN 978-0-471-31544-5
- Social Entrepreneurship: The Art of Mission-Based Business Development. New York: John Wiley & Sons (2000). ISBN 978-0-471-36282-1
- Mission-Based Management: An Organizational Development Workbook. New York: John Wiley & Sons (2001). ISBN 978-0-471-39014-5
- Mission-Based Marketing: An Organizational Development Workbook. New York: John Wiley & Sons (2003). ISBN 978-0-471-23717-4
- Nonprofit Stewardship: A Better Way To Lead Your Mission-Based Organization. St. Paul, MN: Fieldstone Alliance (2004). ISBN 978-0-940069-42-8
- Generations: The Challenge of A Lifetime for Your Nonprofit. St. Paul, MN: Fieldstone Alliance (2007). ISBN 978-0-940069-55-8
