= Moratorium to End the War in Vietnam =

1969 nationwide activism against the US involvement in the Vietnam War

- Part of the opposition to the Vietnam War
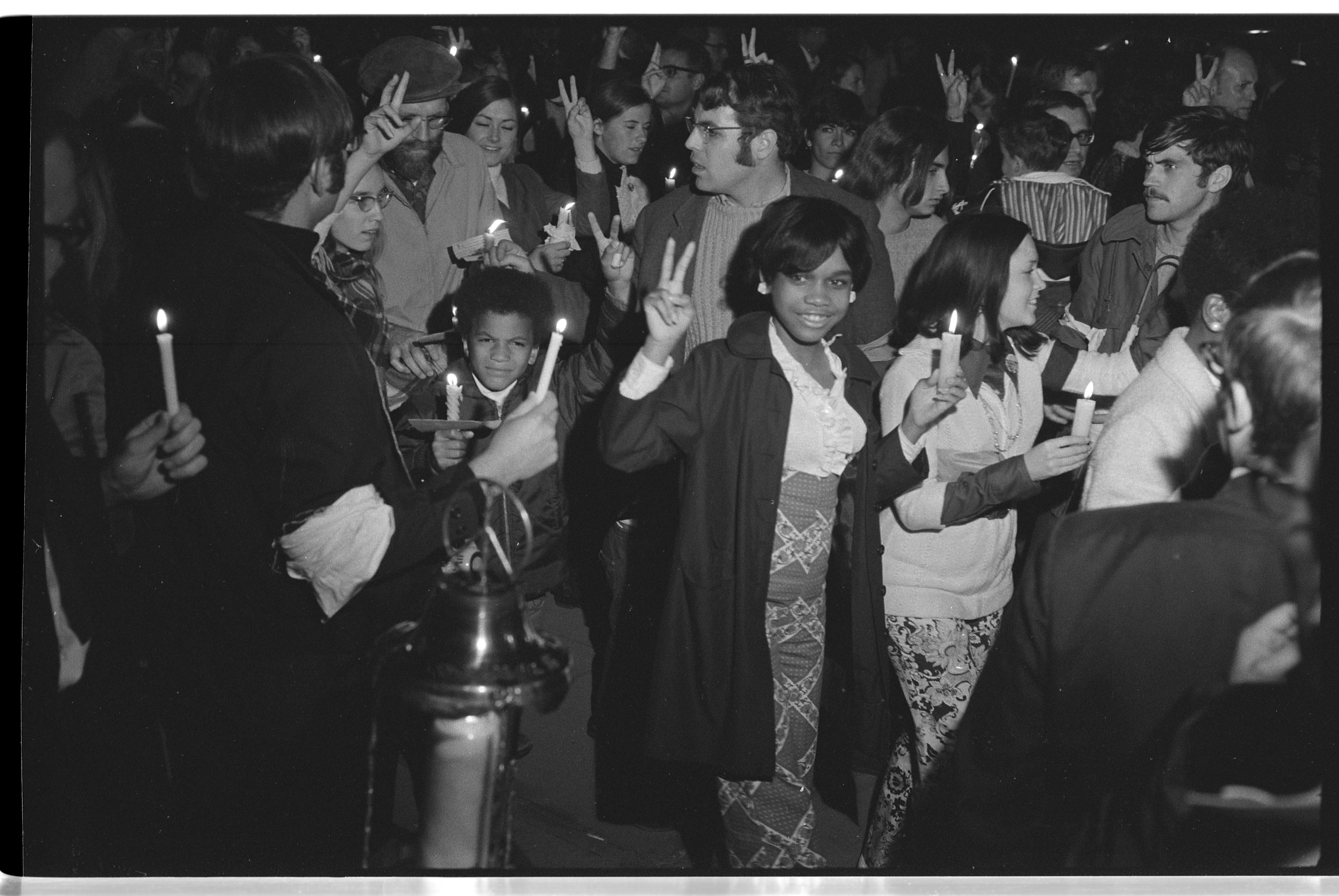
- Crowd of people holding candles at a march at night to the White House, led by Coretta Scott King as part of the Moratorium to End the War in Vietnam. (October 15, 1969)
- Location: United States and Australia
- Goals: Create peaceful mass action to end American involvement in the Vietnam War
- Result: Richard Nixon's "Silent majority" speech; Growing protest movement

The Moratorium to End the War in Vietnam was a massive demonstration and teach-in across the United States against the United States involvement in the Vietnam War. It took place on October 15, 1969, followed a month later, on November 15, 1969, by a large Moratorium March in Washington, D.C.

Fred Halstead writes that it was "the first time [the anti-war movement] reached the level of a full-fledged mass movement."

== First Moratorium ==
=== Background ===
When the new Republican president, Richard Nixon, took office on January 20, 1969, about 34,000 Americans had been killed fighting in Vietnam by that point. During Nixon's first year in office, from January 1969 to January 1970, about another 10,000 Americans were killed fighting in Vietnam. Though Nixon talked much in 1969 of his plans for "Peace with Honor" and Vietnamization, the general feeling at the time was that Nixon's policies were essentially the same as Lyndon Johnson's.

The Moratorium developed from Jerome Grossman's April 20, 1969 call for a general strike if the war had not concluded by October. David Hawk and Sam Brown, who had previously worked on the unsuccessful 1968 presidential campaign of Eugene McCarthy, changed the concept to a less radical moratorium and began to organize the event as the Vietnam Moratorium Committee with David Mixner, Marge Sklencar, John Gage, and others. Brown, who was 25 years old in 1969, was a former divinity student who had worked hard as a campaign volunteer for Senator McCarthy in 1968, developed the concept of the moratorium protests. Brown felt that protests should take place in communities rather than on university campuses so that "the heartland folks felt it belonged to them". Brown and other moderate leaders of the anti-war movement believed that the best way of bringing pressure on Nixon was to ensure the movement had a "respectable" face in order to win the support of the largest number of Americans, many of whom did not much like either the hippie counterculture or the radical New Left movement. The Vietnam Moratorium Committee sought the support of "respectable" groups like the civil rights movement, churches, university faculties, unions, business leaders, and politicians. Before the Moratorium of October 15, the North Vietnamese Premier Phạm Văn Đồng released a letter praising the marchers for trying to save young American men "from a useless death in Vietnam". In a speech written by Patrick Buchanan, the Vice President, Spiro Agnew, demanded that the organizers of the Moratorium disavow Đồng's letter and accused them of being "communist dupes".

As with previous large anti-war demonstrations, including the National Mobilization Committee to End the War in Vietnam's April 15, 1967 march on the United Nations and their 1967 March on the Pentagon, the event was a clear success, with millions participating throughout the world. Future U.S. President Bill Clinton, then a Rhodes Scholar at Oxford, organized and participated in the demonstration in England; this later became an issue in his presidential campaign.

=== March ===
In New York City, the day marked Game 4 of the 1969 World Series and included controversy as Mayor John Lindsay wanted the US flag to be flown at half-staff; however, Baseball Commissioner Bowie Kuhn overruled the mayor and ordered the flag to be flown at full staff. Also, Mets Game 4 Starter Tom Seaver had his face on some anti-Moratorium Day literature distributed before the game. Seaver claimed that his picture was used without his knowledge or approval. The Mets won that day's game in 10 innings and would go on to win the Series the next day.

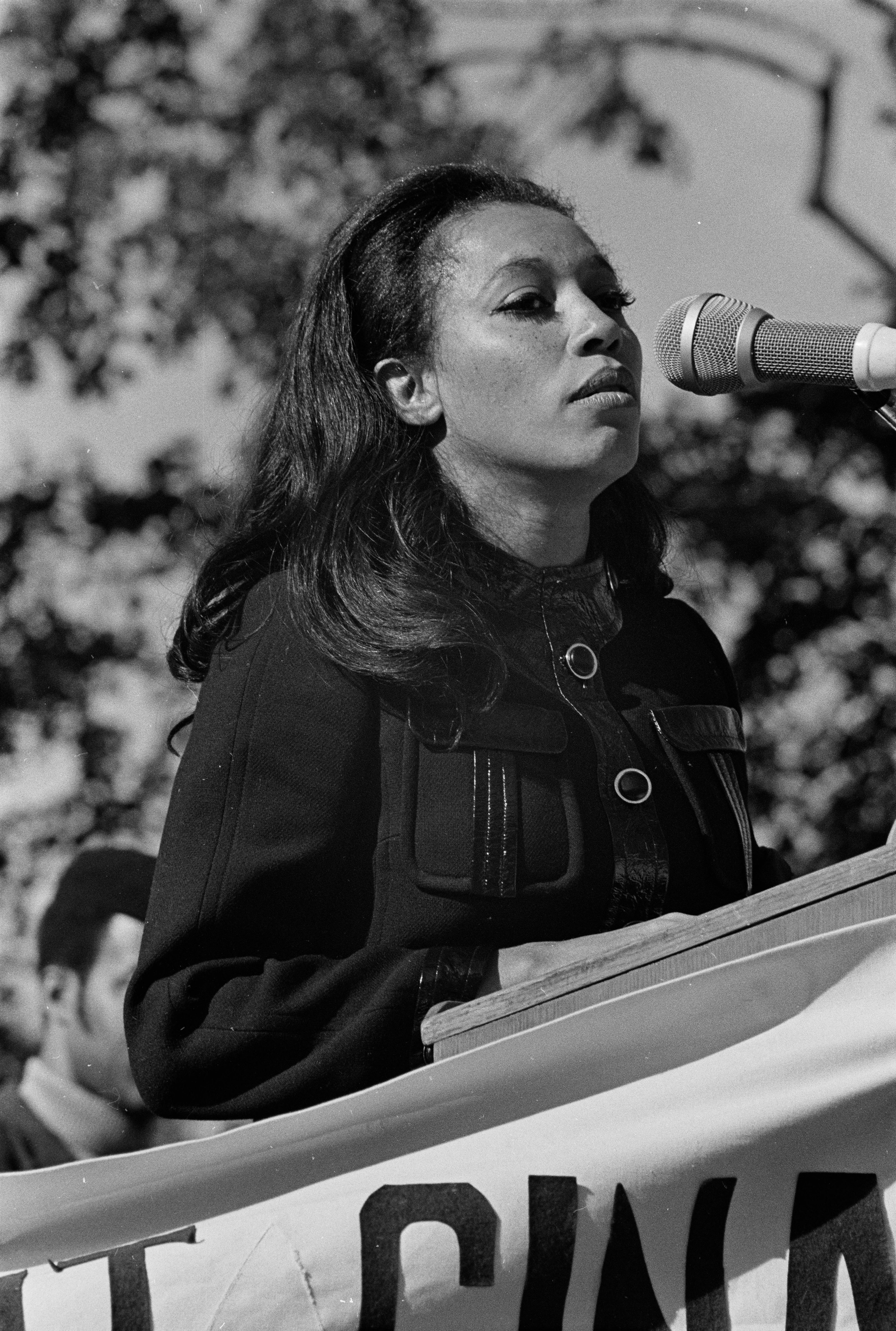
Diana Sands gives a speech at the Moratorium Day demonstration in New York City, October 15, 1969

Over a quarter of a million people attended the Moratorium march in Washington, D.C., where they marched down Pennsylvania Avenue in the evening bearing candles led by Coretta Scott King to the White House. Scott King told the marchers that it would have delighted her assassinated husband, Martin Luther King Jr., to have seen people of all races rallying together for the cause of peace. Across New York City, another quarter of a million people participated in moratorium events, from Wall Street to Bryant Park. About 100,000 people blanketed Boston Common, where John Kenneth Galbraith and Senator George McGovern spoke. Tens of thousands attended other events nationwide to mark the day, from Los Angeles to Philadelphia. Unlike the protests at the Democratic Convention in Chicago in August 1968 which led to a police riot, the Moratorium marches on October 15 were completely peaceful, attended by families and people of all ages and faiths, with the main theme being grief and sorrow over the war, instead of anger and rage. The journalist Stanley Karnow wrote the Moratorium marches were "...a sober, almost melancholy manifestation of middle class concern...". Speakers at the Moratorium marches included Coretta Scott King, Dr. Benjamin Spock, David Dellinger, W. Averell Harriman, and Arthur Goldberg. In his speech in New York, Harriman predicted that Nixon "is going to have to pay attention". About Nixon's statement that he would not be affected by Moratorium marches, the comedian Dick Gregory told the crowd: "The President says nothing you kids do will have any effect on him. Well, I suggest he make one long-distance call to the LBJ ranch".

=== Aftermath ===
In a statement to the press, Nixon stated: "Under no circumstances will I be affected" as "policy made in the streets equals anarchy". On October 15, 1969, the White House press secretary declared that Nixon was completely indifferent to the Moratorium and that day had been "business as usual". In private, Nixon was enraged by the Moratorium and felt very much besieged as he felt that the Moratorium had undercut his policy of winning "peace with honor" in Vietnam. Nixon ordered his aides to start writing a speech to rebut the Moratorium protests, which took two weeks to produce a version that was satisfactory to the president. On October 19, 1969, Agnew in a speech in New Orleans charged that "a spirit of national masochism prevails, encouraged by an effete corps of impudent snobs who characterize themselves as intellectuals". Agnew also accused the peace movement of being controlled by "hardcore dissidents and professional anarchists" who were planning "wilder, more violent" demonstrations at the next Moratorium. In its coverage of the first marches, an article in Time remarked that the Moratorium had brought "new respectability and popularity" to the anti-war movement. In various locations all over the United States, over 15 million people took part in marches against the war on October 15. The success of the Moratorium marches was due largely to avoiding the violence that many Americans associated with the New Left and the hippie "sex, drugs and rock 'n' roll" sensibility that was widely considered to be anti-social.

In response to the Moratorium of October 15, on the evening of November 3, 1969 Nixon went on national television to give his "silent majority speech" asking for the support of the "silent majority" of Americans for his Vietnam War policy. In his speech, Nixon professed to share the goal of the protesters of peace in Vietnam, but he argued that the United States had to win in Vietnam, which would require keeping the war going until such a time that the government of North Vietnam ceased trying to overthrow the government of South Vietnam. Nixon implicitly conceded the point to the anti-war movement that South Vietnam was not important, saying the real issue was US credibility, as he maintained that American allies would lose faith if the United States did not stand by South Vietnam. Nixon promised that his policy of Vietnamization would gradually lower American losses in Vietnam; stated he was willing to compromise provided that North Vietnam recognized South Vietnam; and finally warned that it would take "strong and effective measures" if the war continued. Nixon ended his "silent majority speech" with: "And so tonight, to you, the great silent majority of my fellow Americans—I ask for your support. Let us be united for peace. Let us be united against defeat. Because let us understand: North Vietnam cannot defeat or humiliate the United States. Only Americans can do that".

The public response to Nixon's "silent majority speech" was very positive with the phone lines to the White House becoming jammed in the hours after he gave his speech as too many people called the White House to congratulate the president. Likewise, the response to Agnew's speech attacking the media was positive in certain quarters of America, through unlike Nixon's "silent majority speech" where he professed to be speaking on behalf of the "silent majority", Agnew's speech was intentionally meant to be provocative and polarizing. As Nixon's public approval ratings soared, he told his aides in a meeting in the Oval Office: "We've got those liberal bastards on the run now, and we're going to keep them on the run". On November 13, in Des Moines, Agnew lashed out in a speech against the Moratorium declaring that it was all the work of the media who were "a small and unelected elite that do not—I repeat do not—represent the view of America". Agnew accused the media of being biased against Nixon and for the peace movement, and further stated his belief that the media "to a man" represented "the geographic and intellectual confines of New York and Washington". Agnew in particular singled out The New York Times and The Washington Post for criticism.

== Second Moratorium ==
=== Developments ===
In early November 1969, two disclosures put the wind back into the sails of the antiwar movement. Colonel Robert Rheault of the U.S. Army Special Forces was charged with ordering the murder of a South Vietnamese official suspected of being a Viet Cong spy, which was described euphemistically in an Army report as "termination with extreme prejudice". More shockingly to the American people, on November 12, 1969, journalist Seymour Hersh revealed the My Lai Massacre which had occurred on March 16, 1968, which led to Lieutenant William Calley being charged with murder. The My Lai massacre become a symbol to the anti-war movement of the brutality of the Vietnam war, and much of the success of the second Moratorium march was due to the revelation of the My Lai massacre. Karnow described the United States by the fall of 1969 as being very much a polarized and divided nation with about roughly half of the nation supporting Nixon's policies in Vietnam and the other half opposed.

=== March ===
Second Moratorium March
November 15, 1969
Washington, D.C.

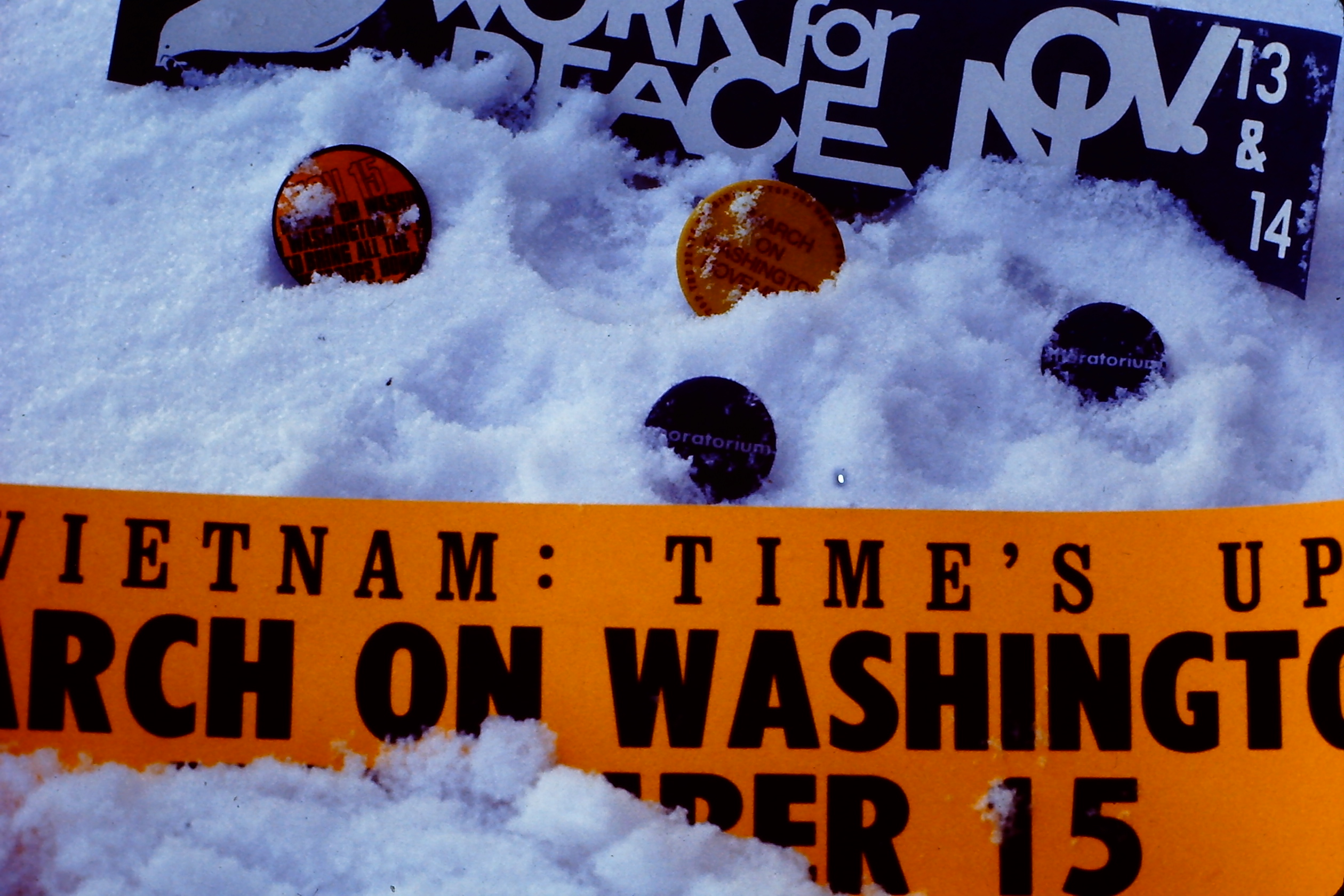
Badges and stickers

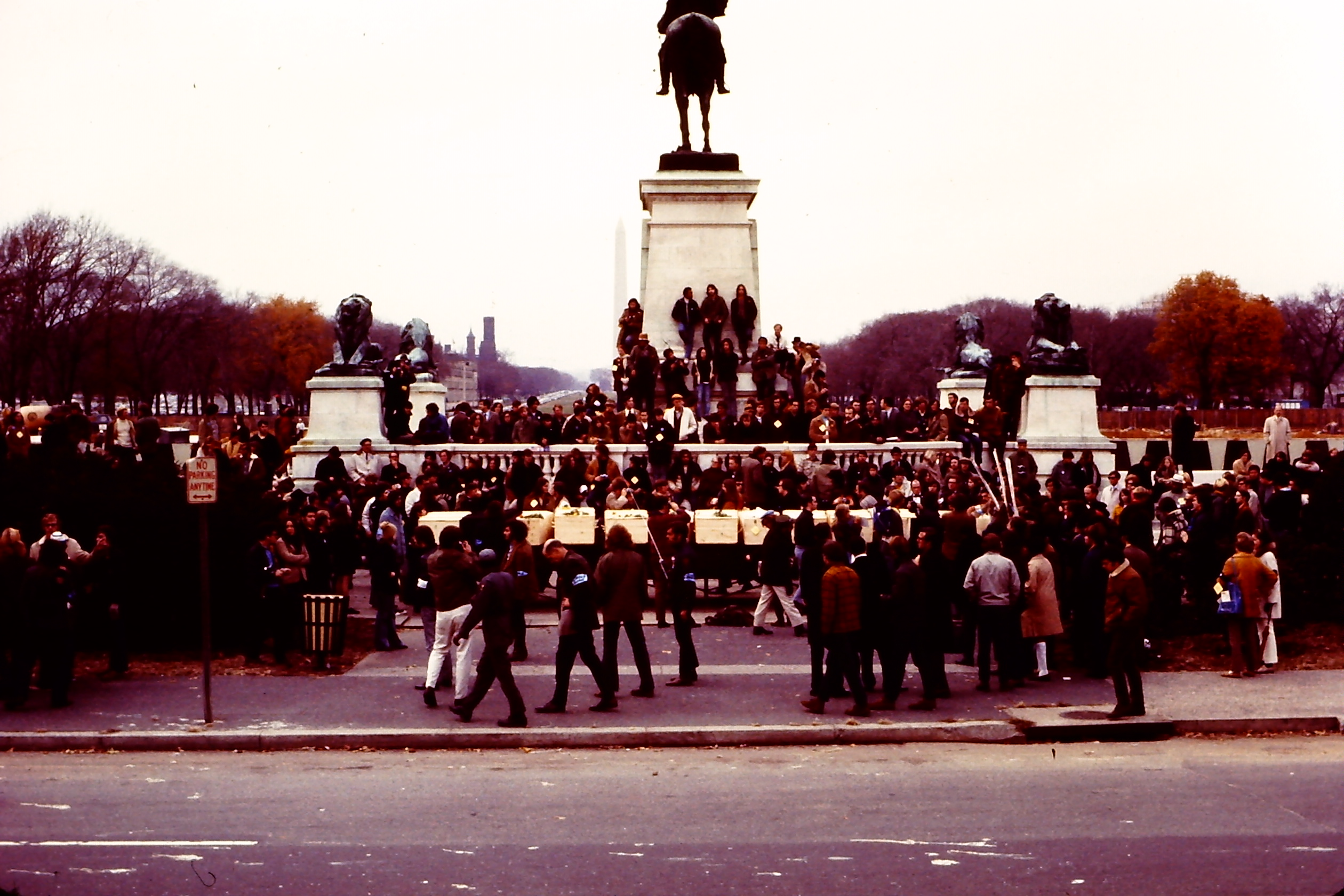
Near U.S. Capitol

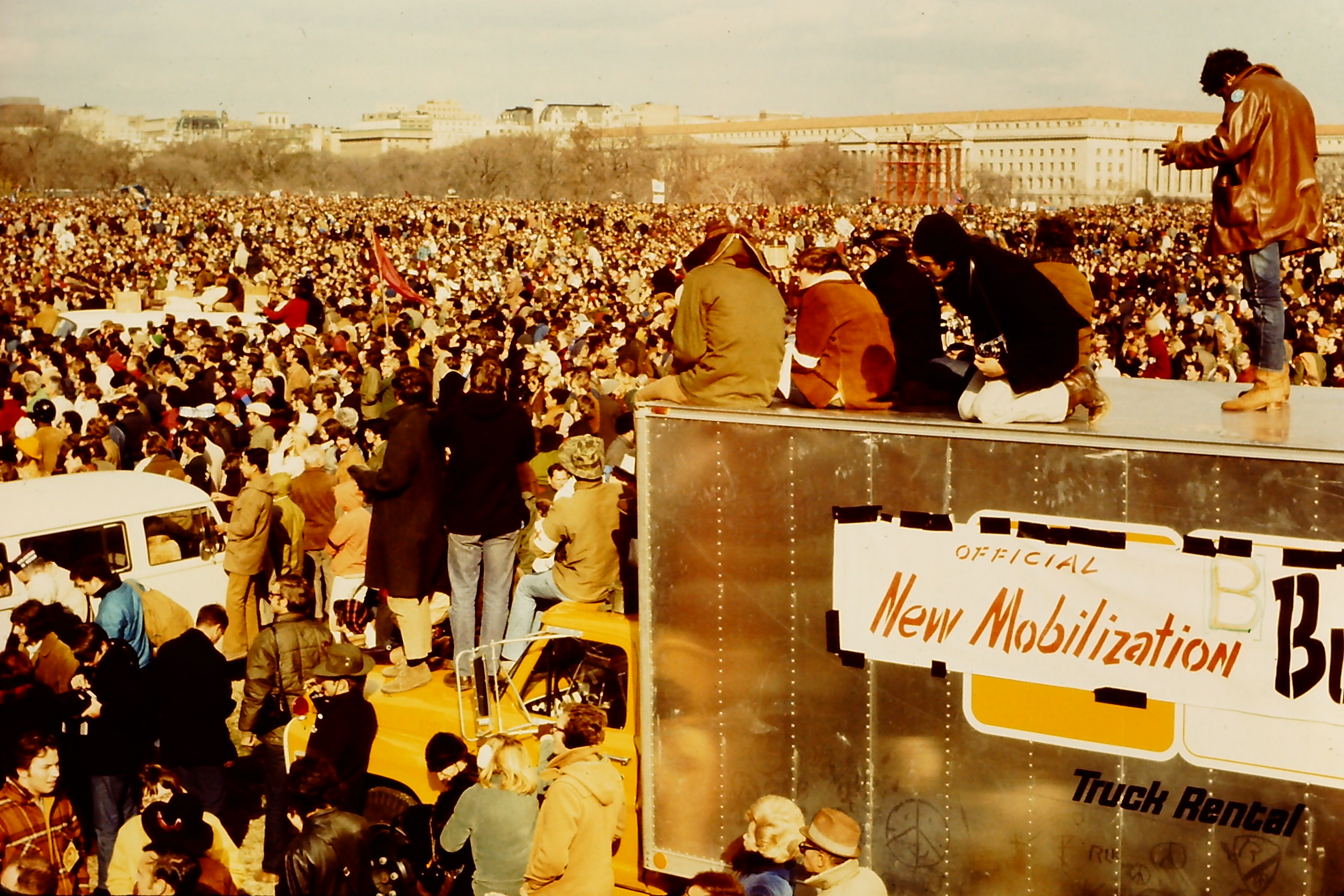
Near Washington Monument

The first nationwide Moratorium was followed on Saturday, November 15, 1969, by a second massive Moratorium march in Washington, D.C., which attracted over 500,000 demonstrators against the war, including many performers and activists. This massive Saturday march and rally was preceded by the March against Death, which began on Thursday evening and continued throughout that night and all the next day. Over 40,000 people gathered to parade silently down Pennsylvania Avenue to the White House. Hour after hour, they walked in single file, each bearing a placard with the name of a dead American soldier or a destroyed Vietnamese village, and carrying a candle. The march was silent except for the playing of six drums, which played funeral tunes. The marchers finished in front of the Capitol building, where the placards were placed in coffins. Despite his public disdain, Nixon watched the march on television, staying up until 11 pm as he obsessively watched the demonstration outside of the White House and tried to count how many people were participating, eventually reaching the figure of 325,000. Nixon joked that he should send helicopters to blow out the candles.

The vast majority of demonstrators during these days were peaceful; however, late on Friday, a small conflict broke out at DuPont Circle, and the police sprayed the crowd with tear gas. The people of Washington, D.C., generously opened schools, seminaries, and other places of shelter to the thousands of students and others who converged for this purpose. In addition, the Smithsonian Museum complex was opened to allow protesters a place to sleep. A daytime march before the White House was lined by parked tour buses and uniformed police officers, some flashing peace symbols on the inside of their jackets in a show of support for the crowd. The second Moratorium drew an even larger crowd than the first, and it is considered to have been the largest demonstration ever in Washington, D.C. The Woodstock Music Festival had drawn about 400,000 people in August 1969, and it was estimated by some that the second Moratorium had brought out a number equal to "two Woodstocks".

Nixon said about the march, "Now, I understand that there has been, and continues to be, opposition to the war in Vietnam on the campuses and also in the nation. As far as this kind of activity is concerned, we expect it; however, under no circumstances will I be affected whatever by it."

On Moratorium Day, half a million demonstrators gathered across from the White House for a rally where they were led by Pete Seeger in singing John Lennon's new song "Give Peace A Chance" for ten minutes or more. His voice above the crowd, Seeger interspersed phrases like, "Are you listening, Nixon?", "Are you listening, Agnew?", "Are you listening, in the Pentagon?" between the choruses of protesters singing, "All we are saying ... is give peace a chance". Others who joined the second Moratorium included the composer Leonard Bernstein, the folk music group Peter, Paul and Mary, the singer John Denver, the folk musician Arlo Guthrie and the Cleveland String Quartet who all played for the crowd. Four touring companies arrived to perform songs from the hippie musical Hair. After the main demonstration about 10,000 protesters headed to the Justice Department. When rocks and sticks were thrown at the building, police responded with a massive tear gas attack while other police units blocked Constitution Avenue. Two thousand people trying to get between the National Museum of Natural History and a concrete underpass could move no faster than a very slow walk. Big clouds of tear gas covered the crowd. Police fired more canisters of gas into the air so that they landed and exploded in the midst of the crowd on the feet and clothing of the retreating demonstrators.

In San Francisco, over a quarter million of people took part in the march against the war on November 15. The school boards in San Francisco refused permission for high school students to take part in the second moratorium, declaring that the moratorium was "unpatriotic". As a result, over 50% of the students in San Francisco high schools missed classes on November 14, as they instead went out to protest against the war the day before the march.

=== Aftermath ===
Activists at some universities continued to hold monthly "Moratoria" on the 15th of each month.

== Australian Moratoriums ==
=== Background ===
Following the success of the November 1969 Moratorium in the United States, a series of citizen groups opposed to the war in Vietnam decided to band together to put on a Moratorium in Australia. Late in 1969, they formed the Vietnam Moratorium Campaign or VMC, which had its own executive, a permanent secretary and a number of affiliated organizations. The group that claims credit for mooting the idea is the Congress for International Co-operation and Disarmament (or CICD), a pacifist organization formed out of the Melbourne Peace Congress of 1959.

The VMC and CICD certainly shared a number of members, among them Jim Cairns, who was made chairman, and John Lloyd, secretary of both organizations. The VMC was, however, a much more representative body, including a wide variety of pre-existing Australian groups: Church groups, Trade Unions, radical and moderate student organizations, pacifist groups and anti-war groups. The VMC inherited the CICD's interstate connections with the Association for International Co-operation and Disarmament (its NSW equivalent), the Campaign for Peace in Vietnam (SA) and the Queensland Peace Council for International Co-Operation and Disarmament, giving it a truly national character. The structure of the Moratorium, in Victoria at least, was conflicted—the VMC executive vied for control with the Richmond Town Hall mass public meetings, which could involve up to 600 members and usually went late into the evening, full of arguments over slogans and policies.

=== Moratoriums ===
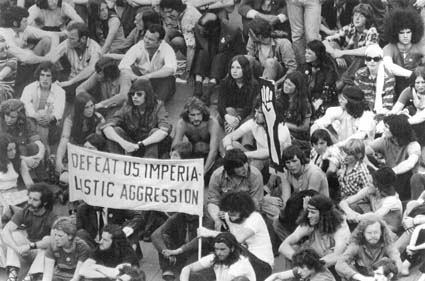
Vietnam Moratorium protesters in the City Square, Melbourne, September 18, 1970

Work began quickly to organize the Moratorium. The original date was set for April 1970, but changed soon after to May 8, 9 and 10, to coincide with protests in the US, just days after the killings of four students at Kent State. The demonstration in Melbourne, held on May 8 and led by member of Parliament Jim Cairns, had over 100,000 people taking to the streets in Melbourne alone. Similar demonstrations were held in Sydney, Brisbane, Adelaide and Hobart. Across Australia, it was estimated that 200,000 people were involved.

The second Vietnam Moratorium in September 1970 was smaller; more violence occurred. Fifty thousand people participated and there were violent incidents between police. Two hundred people were arrested in Sydney. The Melbourne and Brisbane marches were held on September 18.

The third moratorium in June 1971 closed the centre. In Melbourne, on June 30, 1971, there was a march of nearly 100,000 people. By this time public opinion was beginning to turn decisively against conscription and Australian involvement in the war.

== See also ==
- Anti-Vietnam War movement
- List of anti-war organizations
- List of peace activists
- List of protest marches on Washington, D.C.
- National Mobilization Committee to End the War in Vietnam
- Black Moratorium, Moratorium-inspired January 1972 Indigenous rights protest in Australia

== General and cited references ==
- Fountain, Aaron (Summer 2015). "The War in the Schools: San Francisco Bay Area High Schools and the Anti–Vietnam War Movement, 1965–1973". California History. 92 (2): 22–41. doi:10.1525/ch.2015.92.2.22. JSTOR 10.1525/ch.2015.92.2.22.
- Karnow, Stanley (1983). Vietnam: A History. New York: Viking Press.
- Scates, Bob (2022). Draftmen Go Free: A History of the Anti-conscription Movement in Australia. Book review and whole book. The Commons Social Change Library.
