= ACTION (U.S. government agency) =

Nixon administration effort to consolidate volunteer services

ACTION was a United States government agency described as "the Federal Domestic Volunteer Agency". It was formed July 1, 1971, during President Richard Nixon's first term under the provisions of Reorganization Plan Number One, and Executive Order 11603, June 30, 1971, to provide centralized coordination and administration of government-sponsored domestic and international volunteer agencies.

== Formation ==
Among the programs transferred to the new agency were:

- Domestic volunteer programs established in the Office of Economic Opportunity (OEO) pursuant to the Economic Opportunity Act of 1964 (78 Stat. 508), August 20, 1964:
  - Volunteers in Service to America (VISTA) and
  - The National Student Volunteer Program (NSVP);
- Domestic volunteer programs established in the Department of Health, Education, and Welfare pursuant to the Older Americans Act of 1965 (79 Stat. 218), July 14, 1965, and the Older Americans Act Amendments of 1969 (83 Stat. 111), September 17, 1969:
  - The Foster Grandparents and Retired Senior Volunteer Program (RSVP) programs;
- The Peace Corps, the international volunteer programs represented established in the Department of State pursuant to EO 10924, March 1, 1961;
- And the volunteer action clearinghouse functions vested in the Office of Voluntary Action at the Department of Housing and Urban Development, pursuant to EO 11470, May 26, 1969.

ACTION also assumed from OEO responsibility for providing logistical support to the volunteer programs of the Small Business Administration (SBA):

- Service Corps of Retired Executives (SCORE), established April 1964;
- Active Corps of Executives (ACE), established August 1969.

Cartoonist Johnny Hart created a series of animated public service announcements featuring his B.C. comic strip characters to promote ACTION.

== Fate ==
ACTION's responsibility for SCORE and ACE terminated in 1976.

In addition, the Senior Companions program was established in ACTION in 1973. Foster Grandparents, RSVP, and Senior Companions were later merged into the Senior Corps.

The Peace Corps was separated from ACTION in 1982.

The NSVP was redesignated National Center for Service Learning in 1980, and terminated and superseded by Student Community Service Projects in 1987.

ACTION's functions, and the Commission on National and Community Service, were ordered transferred to the newly established Corporation for National and Community Service (CNCS) no later than March 22, 1995, by Section 203 of the National and Community Service Trust Act of 1993 (107 Stat. 892), September 21, 1993. AmeriCorps, which includes VISTA, and Senior Corps are programs of the CNCS.

ACTION was abolished by Presidential Proclamation 6662, April 4, 1994 (3 CFR, 1994 ed., 22). See 362.1.
