= Margo Jennings =

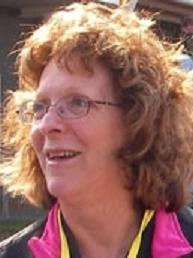
- Born: October 16, 1945 (age 81); New York City, New York
- Occupations: Track and distance coach, teacher
- Spouse: Bobby Jennings

Margo Jennings is a retired teacher and athletics coach. Jennings enjoyed a 40-year teaching career while coaching track athletes of all levels for 30 years. Using her self-created training plan, focusing on low mileage and strength training, Jennings coached many athletes, most notably Maria Mutola (Mozambique), who won Gold in the 800m at the 2000 Sydney Olympics and Dame Kelly Holmes (England) who won double gold in the 800/1500m events at the 2004 Athens Olympics. Jennings is considered by many supporters as one of the best middle distance running coaches in the world.

== Early life ==
Margo Jennings was born and raised in the Bronx borough of New York City. Her mother Ann, an avid fan of the Arts, was a legal stenographer for Louis Nizer before quitting the profession to raise Margo and her older sister Jayne. Jerry, her father, owned a wholesale furrier shop in New York City's Garment District and was a fervent sports fan.

Encouraged by her mother, Jennings studied dance and piano, beginning daily lessons at four years of age and continuing through high school. An accomplished performer by thirteen, she attended high school at the High School of Music and Art in New York City.

She attended the University of Miami from 1962–1966, during the years of segregation, race riots and the rumblings leading up to the Vietnam War. An active civil rights supporter and member of the Phi Sigma Sigma sorority, she was President of the Panhellenic Council during her senior year. Inspired by the African American students she met while student teaching in a "disadvantaged" school in Miami, Jennings developed her positive reinforcement, confidence building teaching methodology. Encouraging her students to set goals and achieve them, she taught with an ethos that tiny steps in the right direction, lead to big changes over time. Her teaching approach was the foundation for her athletics training plan.

== Coaching career ==
=== Middle school coaching ===
After graduating college, Jennings spent seven years teaching in Miami. The next 10 years found her traveling, serving in Volunteers in Service to America (VISTA), living on a farm in Rogue River, Oregon. and becoming a recreational runner. In 1980, Jennings moved to Eugene, Oregon. In 1981, she began teaching 6th grade at Hamlin Middle School in Springfield, Oregon and coaching the 7th and 8th grade boys and girls track and cross country teams.

Studying the training plans of top athletics coaches, Jennings combined her motivational teaching techniques with training she learned from her research, creating her own training program. Her natural ability to inspire her students to set and attain goals, flowed into her role as a coach, resulting in a unique coaching plan that merged confidence and character building activities with hard physical workouts. Jennings led the Hamlin Middle School track and cross country teams to numerous district championship wins.

=== High school coaching ===
In 1987, Springfield High School hired Jennings as the Cross Country/Distance Track Coach for boys and girls. Jennings continued teaching middle school while coaching the high school teams. She continually improved her training program to fit the needs of her athletes, resulting in a double periodized program focusing on low mileage and strength building workouts. Expanding her training plan to include mental strengthening techniques, she taught her athletes that conditioning the mind was as important as training the body. Under Jennings, the Springfield High School teams were competitive in their district.

Maria Mutola arrived at Springfield High School in March 1991, from Mozambique, Africa, on an Olympic Solidarity Scholarship. As a junior in high school, she was already a promising 800m runner. Training under Jennings, Mutola soon shaved enough time off her 800m and 1500m race times that she was competitive with the fastest middle distance females in the world.

=== Elite coaching ===
Jennings coached Mutola over a career that spanned two decades, training her through 2 Olympic medals, 11 World Indoor and Outdoor Championships, and hundreds of first-place finishes on the international elite racing circuit. Maria dominated the 800m distance from 1993 to 2004, becoming the first person to win the entire $1 million IAAF Golden League jackpot on September 5, 2003 in Brussels, Belgium. Mutola is often ranked as the greatest female 800m runner of all time because of her achievements and longevity of her career.

Jennings coached other athletes to success before her retirement from coaching in 2006. At one time, Jennings was coaching four of the eight women in the 800m IAAF World Championship semi-final race in Paris, 2003.

Besides Mutola, Jennings is best known for coaching Kelly Holmes, from 2002–2005, to her infamous Double Gold at the 2004 Athens Olympics. Holmes became Britain's first ever female, double gold medalist at the same Olympic Games. Using her three-part training program, which evolved to include physical, mental and emotional training, Jennings was able to successfully coach Holmes through the emotional weight Holmes gained after an athletics career plagued with injuries and illnesses.

A history-making career, Jennings became the first American woman to coach athletes at the elite level, bringing them to Gold, without ever competing in track and field herself in high school, college, or on the elite circuit.

== Training program ==
By the late nineties, Jennings had perfected her unique training program, tailoring it for middle distance runners. The OlyGold Program is a double periodised plan focusing on physical, mental and emotional preparation, while combining low mileage with high strength building workouts. It contains two cycles per year: The Indoor Cycle and The Outdoor Cycle, with each cycle containing four megacycles: the Foundation Cycle, Intensity Cycle, Specific Preparation Cycle and Racing Cycle; it is a plan that shaped Jennings's athletes into champions. This successful program earned Jennings Mozambique's Olympic Track and Field head coaching position during the 1992 Barcelona, 1996 Atlanta, 2000 Sydney and 2004 Athens Olympic Games, providing her a rare opportunity few other coaches have experienced. Jennings has also coached elite athletes from Namibia, Australia, Canada, Jamaica, the UK and the US.

== Retirement ==
Margo Jennings lives in Eugene, Oregon with her husband Bobby Jennings. She temporarily "came out of retirement" in 2010/2011 to coach the current Oregon State 800 meter champion, Louise Mulvey of Sheldon High School, Eugene. Margo's unique and strong coaching had a huge impact on Mulvey's strategies and mental approach to running which enabled her to reach her 3-year State Title goal in the 800 meter event. Margo is a keynote speaker at many conferences and workshops around the world and is currently mentoring and advising athletes and coaches in the UK, Australia, Mozambique, Namibia, New Zealand, Jamaica and the US.
