= Streetcorner =

Location adjacent to an intersection of two roads

A streetcorner or street corner is the location which lies adjacent to an intersection of two roads. Such locations are important in terms of local planning and commerce, usually being the locations of street signs and lamp posts, as well as being a prime spot to locate a business due to visibility and accessibility from traffic going along either of the adjacent streets. One source suggests that this is so for a facility combining two purposes, like an automotive showroom that provides repair services as well: "For all these types of buildings, property on a street corner is most desirable as separate entrances are most easily provided for." Cross walks are often located at street corners as well.

Due to this visibility, street-corners are the choice location for activities ranging from panhandling to prostitution to protests to petition signature drives, hence the term "street-corner politics". This makes street-corners a good location to observe human activity, for purposes of learning what environmental structures best fit that activity. Sidewalks at street corners tend to be rounded, rather than coming to a point, for ease of traffic making turns at the intersection.

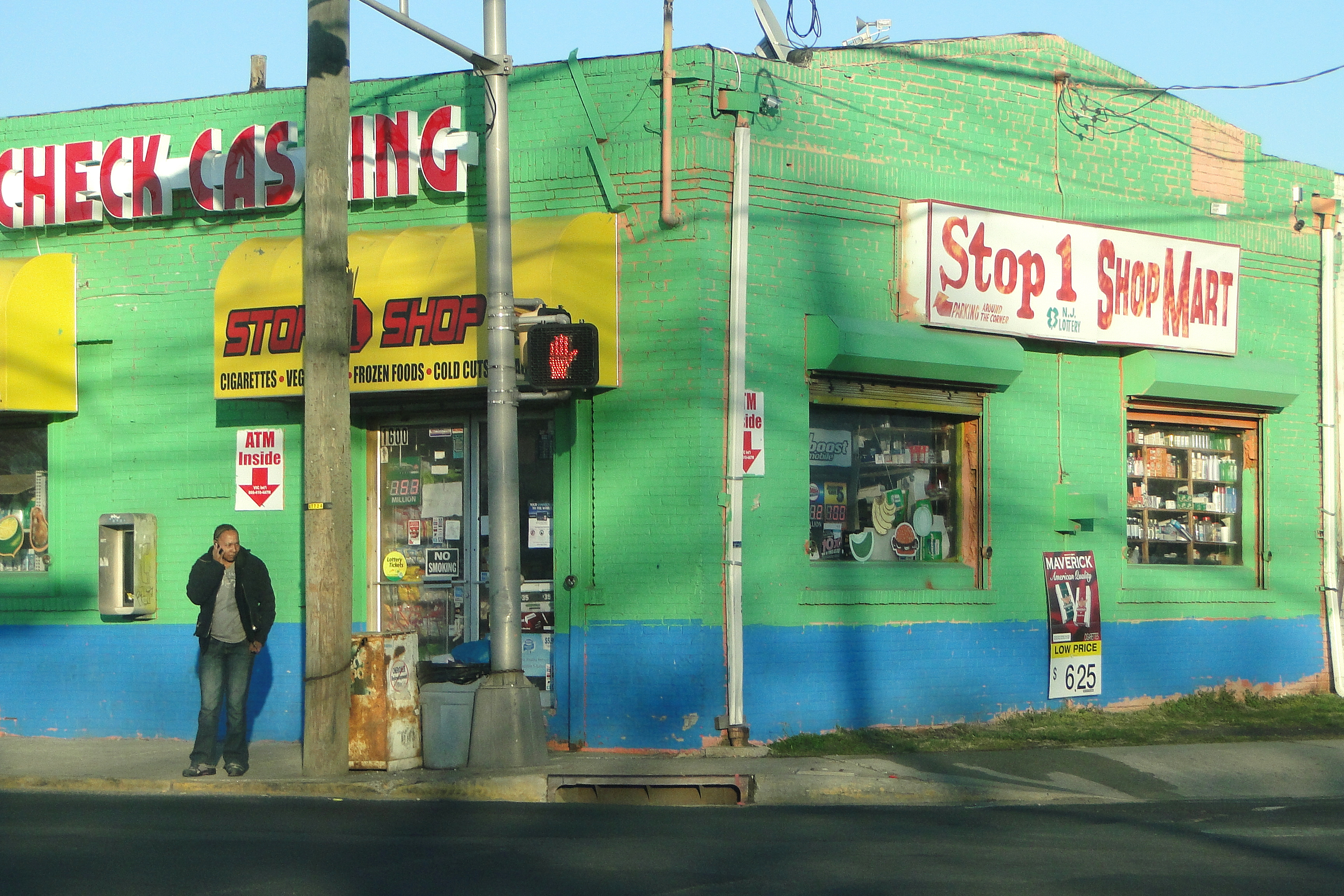
An urban street-corner in Camden, New Jersey.

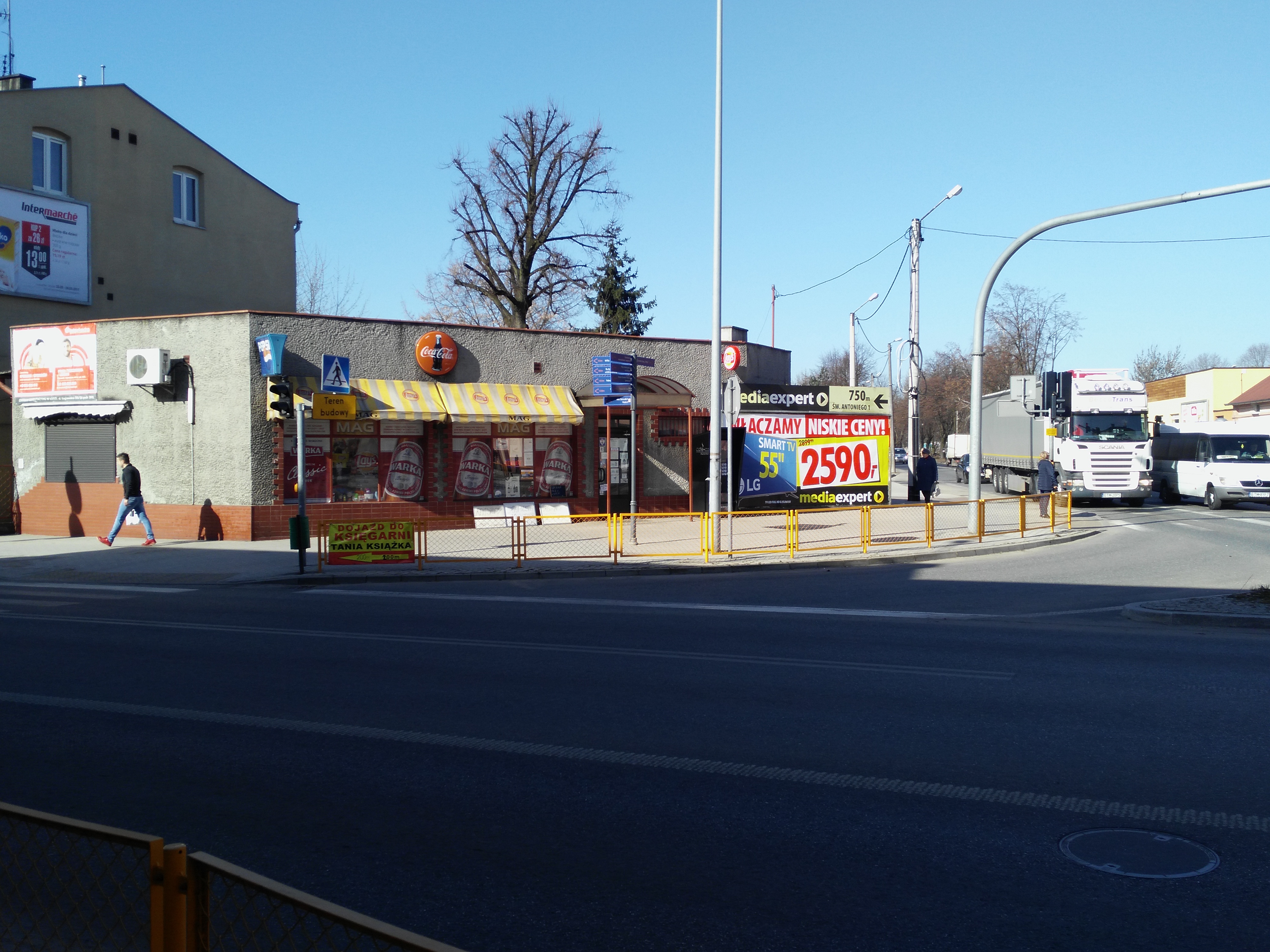
A street-corner in Tomaszów Mazowiecki, Poland
