= Astrid Oosenbrug =

Dutch politician (born 1968)

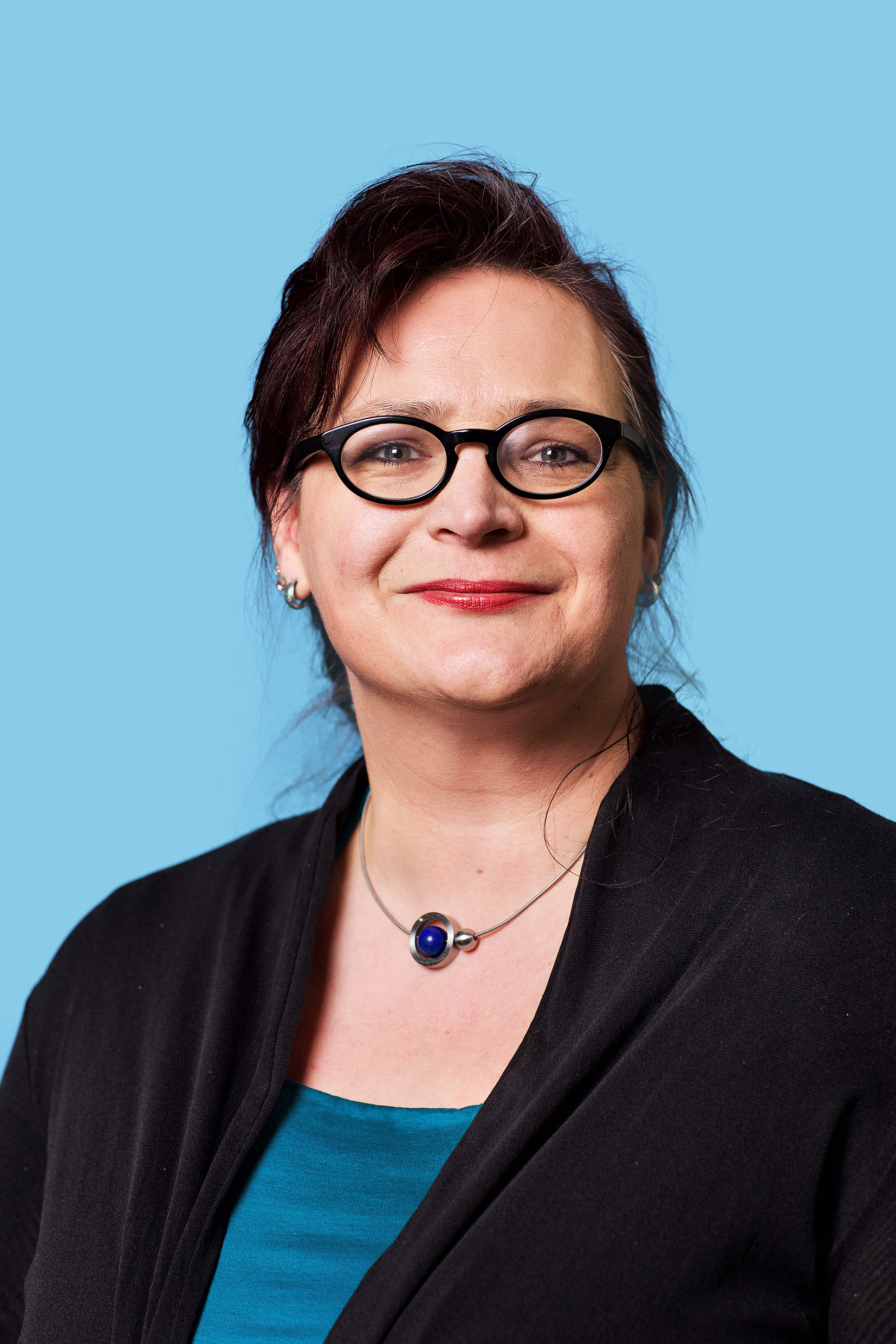
- Astrid Oosenbrug

Member of the House of Representatives
- In office 20 September 2012 – 23 March 2017

Personal details
- Born: 6 July 1968 (age 57)
- Party: Labour Party
- Occupation: Politician

Roberta Francina Astrid Oosenbrug-Blokland (born 6 July 1968) is a Dutch politician who served as a member of the House of Representatives between 20 September 2012 and 23 March 2017. She is a member of the Labour Party (PvdA). Born in Rotterdam, she previously was a member of the municipal council of Lansingerland from 2010 to 2012.
