= AmeriCorps Seniors =

United States government program

Agency overview
- Jurisdiction: Federal government of the United States
- Headquarters: Washington, D.C.
- Agency executive: Atalaya Sergi, Director
- Parent agency: AmeriCorps
- Website: https://www.americorps.gov/

AmeriCorps Seniors is a United States government program run by the Corporation for National and Community Service. The program engages volunteers aged 55 and older to serve their communities. There are over 200,000 volunteers nationwide.

AmeriCorps Seniors is made up of seven constituent programs—State and National, VISTA, NCCC (National Civilian Community Corps), Foster Grandparents, Retired and Senior Volunteer Program (RSVP), Senior Companions and Volunteer in Community—which were brought together under one umbrella when the Corporation for National and Community Service (CNCS) was formed by then-president Bill Clinton in 1993. At that time, the three programs were collectively called Senior Corps. On September 29, 2020, CNCS announced the agency was rebranding itself as AmeriCorps, and Senior Corps was being rebranded as AmeriCorps Seniors.

Three of the programs have unique histories, and each was developed to meet a specific need. The Foster Grandparent Program was piloted on August 28, 1965, to entice low income people over 60 in community service. The Senior Companion Program began as part of the Department of Health, Education and Welfare and Administration on Aging in 1968, and before being legislated and signed into law under President Richard Nixon. The Retired and Senior Volunteer Program (RSVP) began as an outgrowth by private groups and government agencies to create opportunities of engagement, activity, and growth for older Americans following the work of the Community Service Society of New York on Staten Island beginning in 1965; the Society's success led the Older Americans Act being amended to create RSVP as a nationwide program in 1969.

== History ==
Senior Corps was formed from a merge of its constituent programs: Foster Grandparents, Retired and Senior Volunteer Program (RSVP), and Senior Companions. The three were originally mandated under the Domestic Volunteer Service Act of 1973 with similar aims. The three programs have unique histories, and each was developed to meet a specific need, but all were crafted on the same belief that older adults are valuable resources to their communities. When the Corporation for National and Community Service was formed by then-president Bill Clinton in 1993, the three organizations were reformed into the single agency Senior Corps.

The Foster Grandparent Program was piloted on August 28, 1965, to attract low income individuals over 60 into community service. The program quickly revealed the positive impact these thriving older Americans have on exceptional and special needs children and grew in scope. In the 1980s, the Foster Grandparent Program was championed by First Lady Nancy Reagan. She drew attention to the program and helped it grow as one of her pet projects.

In 1968, the Senior Companion Program began as part of the Department of Health, Education and Welfare and Administration on Aging. Five years later, President Richard Nixon asked Congress to expand the role of low-income older volunteers who provide personal services to others. Seven months later, the Senior Companion Program was signed into law.

RSVP began as an outgrowth by private groups and government agencies to create opportunities of engagement, activity, and growth for older Americans. One of the earliest programs, the Community Service Society of New York, began in 1965 on Staten Island. The project involved a small group of volunteers who were dedicated to serving their communities in a variety of ways. It was due to the success of their efforts that led to an amendment to the Older Americans Act, creating RSVP as a nationwide program in 1969.

== Programs ==
Senior Corps is for people age 55+ who want to share their experiences with others who are most in need of mentors, coaches, or a companion.

=== Foster Grandparents ===
First operational on August 28, 1965, the Foster Grandparents program enables seniors to interact with and support young children, thus acting as foster grandparents. Open to seniors 55 and over, the program's goal is to provide "grandparents" who will give emotional support to victims of abuse and tutor, mentor, and care for children with disabilities. The participants make a difference in the lives of these children, receive pre-service and monthly training sessions, transportation reimbursement, an annual physical, and accident and liability insurance while working with the child/children. Some Foster Grandparents also receive small tax-free stipends to offset costs incurred while participating in the program; eligibility for these stipends is based on income criteria.

=== RSVP ===
Much like the Foster Grandparents program, the Retired and Senior Volunteer Program (RSVP) seeks to provide a way in which senior citizens can give back to their community. Flexible in nature, RSVP allows participants to choose how and when they work. Open to seniors 55 and over, the program's goals are wide and varied, and include job training, tutoring children, building homes, helping immunize children, relief services, and aid to community organizations. Volunteers are given a pre-service orientation, on-the-job training from the placement agency or organization, and supplemental insurance while on duty. This program does not provide a stipend.

One of the more widespread RSVP programs is a telephone reassurance service; RSVP volunteers contact other seniors by phone to ensure their well-being and provide friendly chat.

=== Senior Companions ===
The Senior Companions program is aimed at helping citizens who need extra assistance to live independently, such as adults with disabilities or those with terminal illnesses and their caregivers. Participants provide both emotional and physical support by assisting with simple house chores, providing transportation, and offering companionship.

A senior companion must be 55 years of age and able to give between 5 and 40 hours of service per week. In addition to making a significant contribution to the lives of others, participants receive pre-service and monthly training, transportation reimbursement, an annual physical, and meals and accident and liability insurance while on duty. Income-eligible Senior Companions also receive a modest, tax-free stipend to offset the cost of volunteering.

== See also ==
- Community service
- Elderly care
