= Jerome Grossman =

Jerome Grossman (August 23, 1917 – December 18, 2013) was a political activist and commentator, particularly on the issues of weapons of mass destruction and nuclear weapons. A self-styled "relentless liberal", Grossman played roles in many electoral campaigns and efforts to end the Vietnam War and the Iraq War.

Born in Boston, Massachusetts, raised in Brookline, he lived in Newton for 30 years, then in Wellesley for 30 years. A 1938 graduate of Harvard College, Grossman taught at Tufts University and Palm Beach Community College. He was the author of Relentless Liberal (New York, Vantage Press, 1996) and a contributing author to such publications as The Chicago Tribune.

Grossman had a number of careers:

- Business as President of Massachusetts Envelope Company, now Grossman Marketing Group
- Education as lecturer at Tufts University, Regis College, Palm Beach Community College
- Politics as Member, Democratic National Committee
- Chairman, Father Drinan for Congress
- Director, Eugene McCarthy presidential campaign, 1968
- Director, George McGovern presidential campaign, 1972
- Manager, Stuart Hughes for Senate
- Anti-war activist as Chairman, Council for a Livable World
- Originator, Vietnam Moratorium Movement
- Radio Commentator at WCRB – Massachusetts, WJNO – Florida
- Civil Liberties as Chairman, Civil Liberties Union of Massachusetts Foundation
