= AmeriCorps VISTA =

US national service program to alleviate poverty

Agency overview
- Jurisdiction: Federal government of the United States
- Headquarters: Washington, D.C.
- Agency executive: Jennifer Bastress-Tahmesebi, Acting Agency Head
- Parent agency: AmeriCorps
- Website: americorps.gov

Domestic Volunteer Service Act of 1973
- Long title: An Act to provide for the operation of domestic volunteer service programs, and for other purposes.
- Enacted by: the 93rd United States Congress

Citations
- Public law: Pub. L. 93-113
- Statutes at Large: 87 Stat. 394

Legislative history
- Signed into law by President Richard Nixon on October 1, 1973

AmeriCorps VISTA is a national service program designed to alleviate poverty. President John F. Kennedy originated the idea for VISTA, which was founded as Volunteers in Service to America in 1965, and incorporated into the AmeriCorps network of programs in 1993. VISTA is an acronym for Volunteers in Service to America.

For FY 2026, VISTA received $103.29M in appropriations from Congress despite being zeroed out in the FY 2026 official budget request that President Donald Trump sent to Congress. As outlined in his previous fiscal year budgets, this budget proposed the elimination of the Corporation for National and Community Service (CNCS). It provided funding for an orderly shutdown, including all CNCS programs, such as AmeriCorps Seniors and AmeriCorps (which includes VISTA and NCCC).

== Background ==
VISTA is an anti-poverty program created by Lyndon Johnson's Economic Opportunity Act of 1964 as the domestic version of the Peace Corps. Initially, the program increased employment opportunities for conscientious people who felt they could contribute tangibly to the war on poverty. Volunteers served in communities throughout the U.S., focusing on enriching educational programs and vocational training for the nation's underprivileged classes.

As defined under the Domestic Volunteer Service Act (DVSA) of 1973, VISTA's legislative purpose is to supplement efforts to fight poverty in low-income communities by engaging Americans from all walks of life in a year of full-time service. VISTA members support the program's purpose through three primary objectives: 1) encouraging volunteer service at the local level, 2) generating the commitment of private sector resources, and 3) strengthening local agencies and organizations that serve low-income communities. There are approximately 2,000 VISTA Volunteers serving in over 650 projects throughout the nation.

During the Nixon Administration, VISTA was administered by the newly created Federal agency named ACTION, which also included the Peace Corps, The National Student Volunteer Program (NSVP), the Foster Grandparents Program, the Retired Senior Volunteer Program (RSVP), the Service Corps of Retired Executives (SCORE) Program, and the Active Corps of Executives (ACE) Program. During the Clinton Administration, VISTA was brought under the newly created AmeriCorps program, a division of the Corporation for National and Community Service, and was renamed "AmeriCorps*VISTA", later changed to "AmeriCorps VISTA." VISTA Volunteers sign up with a host agency for a full-time term of service – 365 days. In return for their service, VISTA Volunteers are provided with orientation and training, a living allowance calculated at no less than 105% of the poverty line, settling in and transportation costs, childcare benefits, and a basic health care plan. Upon completion of their one-year term, VISTA Volunteers have the option of receiving a cash stipend or the Segal AmeriCorps Education Award. There is also the option for individuals to serve as Summer Associates for terms of 8, 9 or 10 weeks alongside full-time VISTA Volunteers for a reduced AmeriCorps Education Award.

== Directors ==
The first Director of VISTA was Glenn W. Ferguson and there have been many appointed and acting Directors since then. Brendan Murphy currently serves as the acting Director for AmeriCorps VISTA.

	Director	Service dates	Appointed by	Notes
1	Glenn W. Ferguson	1964–?	Johnson	
	Padraic Kennedy	?–1966		acting director
2	William Crook	1966–1968	Johnson	
	Padraic Kennedy	1968–1970		acting Director
	C.R. Lane	1970		acting Director
3	Carol Khosrovi	1970–?	Nixon	
4	Frank E. Williams	?–1975–?		
5	Margery Tabankin	1977	Carter	Director
6	James H. Burnley IV	1981–1982	Reagan	
7	Jane A. Kenny	1986–1989		Director
	Diana London	1989–1993		Acting Director
8	James Scheibel	1993–	Clinton	
9	Paul Monteiro	2014–2015	Obama	Director
11	Max Finberg	2015–2017	Obama	Director
11	Eileen Conoboy	Jan 2017 – Sep 2019		Acting Director
12	Desiree Tucker-Sorini	Sep 2019 - Jan 2021	Trump	Director
13	Meg Ansara	Jan 2021 – Feb 2023	Biden	Director
14	Carly Bruder	Feb 2023 – Apr 2024		Acting Director
15	Margaret (Maggie) Garvey	Apr 2024 – Apr 2025		Acting Director
16	Brendan Murphy	Apr 2025 – current		Acting Director

== Oversight ==
Created by the National and Community Service Trust Act of 1993, the Corporation for National and Community Service Office of Inspector General (OIG) conducts and supervises independent and objective audits and investigations of Corporation programs and operations. Based on the results of these audits, reviews, and investigations, the OIG recommends policies to promote economy and efficiency and prevent and detect fraud and abuse in the Corporation's programs and operations.

== Member pledge ==
AmeriCorps VISTA Volunteers are required by federal law to take the same oath that federal employees take:

I, (name), do solemnly swear (or affirm) that I will support and defend the Constitution of the United States against all enemies, foreign and domestic; that I will bear true faith and allegiance to the same; that I take this obligation freely, without any mental reservation or purpose of evasion; and that I will well and faithfully discharge the duties of the office on which I am about to enter. [So help me God.]

== See also ==
- List of VISTA volunteers
