= List of Peace Corps volunteers =

Notable former Peace Corps volunteers, by profession

This is a list of notable persons who have served as volunteers in the United States Peace Corps, along with their terms of service. Each volunteer is listed only once.

== Activism and aid ==
- Elaine Jones, American attorney and President of the NAACP Legal Defense and Educational Fund (Turkey 1965–1967)
- Sapreet Kaur, executive director of New York Cares and former executive director of the Sikh Coalition (Kenya and Uganda 1998–2001)
- Cindy Marano, late American economic justice activist (Ecuador 1967–1969)
- Carl Pope, former executive director of the Sierra Club (India 1967–1969)
- Gregory Stanton, founder and president of Genocide Watch (Ivory Coast 1969–1971)
- Thomas Tighe, president and CEO of Direct Relief (Thailand 1986–1988)

== Art and architecture ==
- Wayne Chabre, American sculptor (Lesotho 1969–1970)
- Jonathan Lemon, English-American cartoonist and former musician, known for his work on the Alley Oop comic strip (Honduras 2003–2005)
- Roger K. Lewis, late American architect, urban planner, and professor of architecture at the University of Maryland, College Park (Tunisia 1964–1966)
- Martin Puryear, American artist (Sierra Leone 1964–1966)
- Joel Shapiro, American sculptor (India 1965–1967)

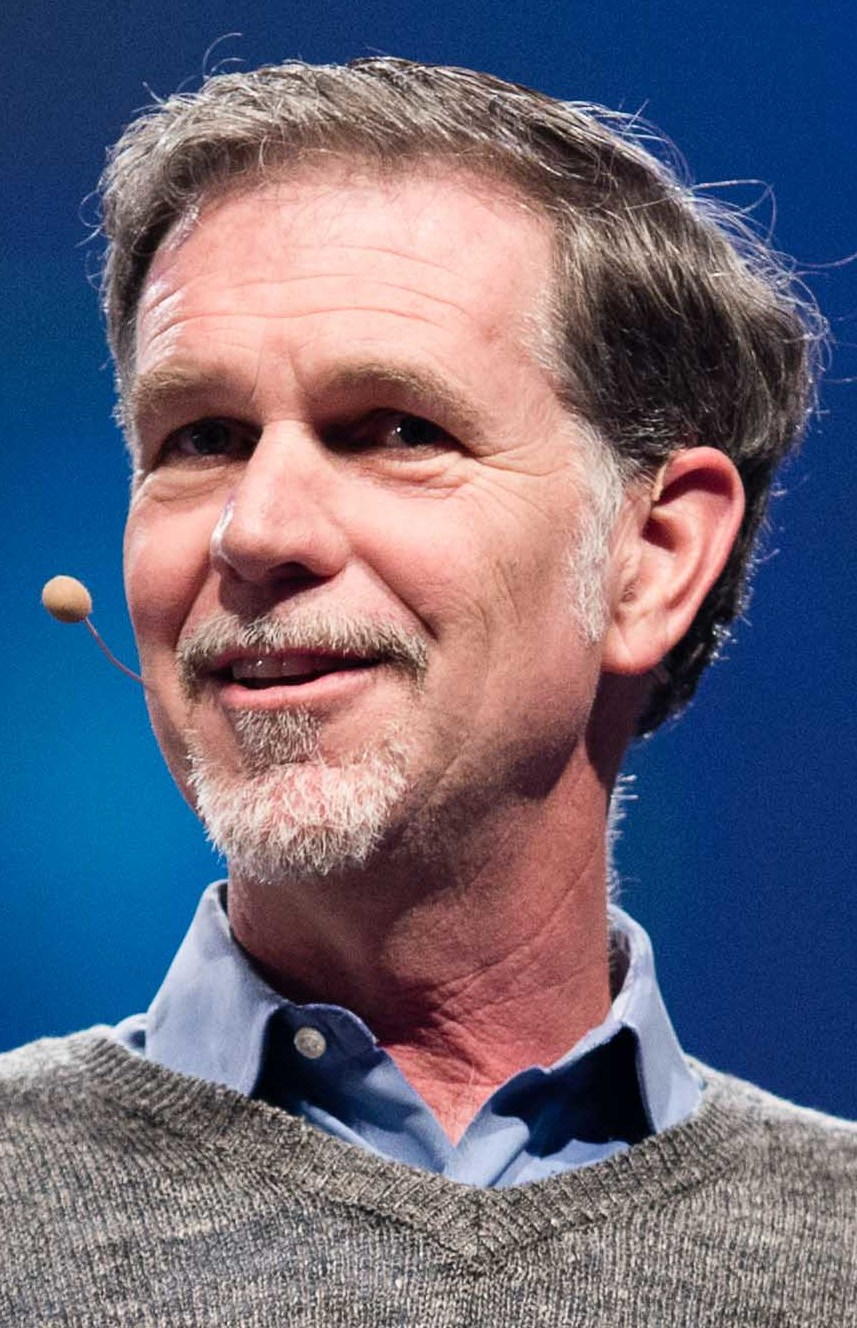
Reed Hastings, co-founder of Netflix (Swaziland 1983–85)

== Business ==
- Patricia Cloherty, late American business woman, former chairwoman and CEO of Delta Private Equity Partners and former chairwoman of The U.S. Russia Investment Fund and former Deputy Administrator of the U.S. Small Business Administration (Brazil 1963–1965)
- Bob Haas, Chairman Emeritus of Levi Strauss & Co., son of Walter A. Haas Jr. and great-great-grandnephew of the company's founder, Levi Strauss (Ivory Coast 1964–1966)
- Reed Hastings, co-founder and chairman of Netflix (Swaziland 1983–1985)
- Christopher Hedrick, co-founder and former CEO of NextStep, former CEO of Intrepid Learning and Kepler and former country director of Peace Corps Senegal (Senegal 1988–1990)
- Alberto Ibargüen, president and CEO of the Knight Foundation (Venezuela 1966–1968)
- Michael McCaskey, late American sports executive and former chairman of the Chicago Bears (Ethiopia 1965–1967)

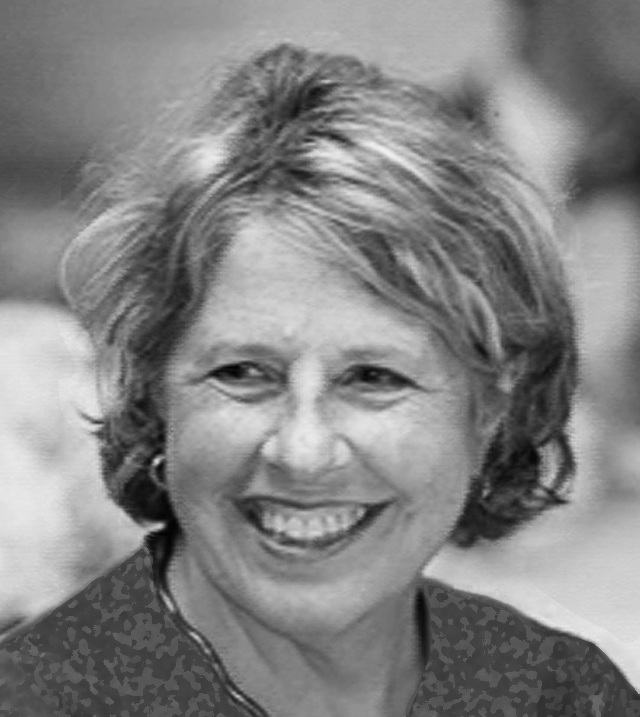
Suzanne Preston Blier, American art historian (Benin 1969–71)

James H. Fowler, American social scientist (Ecuador 1992–94)

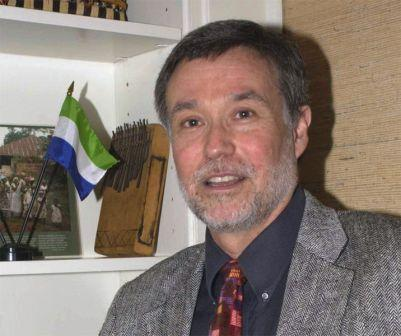
Joseph Opala, OR, American historian (Sierra Leone 1974–77)

== Education ==
- Dirk Ballendorf, late American historian and professor of Micronesian studies at the University of Guam (Philippines 1961–1963)
- Suzanne Preston Blier, American art historian and Allen Whitehill Clowes Professor of Fine Arts and of African and African American Studies at Harvard University (Benin 1969–1971)
- Guy Consolmagno, American research astronomer, Jesuit religious brother and Director of the Vatican Observatory (Kenya 1983–1985)
- Bruce Cumings, Gustavus F. and Ann M. Swift Distinguished Service Professor in History at the University of Chicago (Korea 1967–1968)
- James H. Fowler, American social scientist and professor of political science at the University of California, San Diego (Ecuador 1992–1994)
- Robert H. Frank, Henrietta Johnson Louis Professor of Management and professor of economics at Cornell University
- Allan Gibbard, American ethicist and Richard B. Brandt Distinguished University Professor Emeritus of Philosophy at the University of Michigan (Ghana 1963–1965)
- Clark Gibson, American political scientist and university professor at the University of California, San Diego (Nepal)
- José Gómez, late civil rights and labor activist and former executive assistant to Cesar Chavez (Brazil 1968–1969)
- John Haugeland, late American professor of philosophy at the University of Pennsylvania and former chair of the Department of Philosophy at the University of Chicago (Tonga 1966–1968)
- Joel Heinen, Professor of Earth and Environment at Florida International University (Nepal 1984-1988).
- Charles R. Larson, American literary scholar credited as one of the founders of the study of African literature (Nigeria 1962–1964)
- Victor H. Mair, American sinologist and professor of Chinese at the University of Pennsylvania (Nepal 1965–1967)
- William G. Moseley, DeWitt Wallace Professor of Geography at Macalester College (Mali 1987–1989)
- Joseph Opala, American historian, university professor at James Madison University (Sierra Leone 1974–1977)
- Kenneth Poeppelmeier, Charles and Emma Morrison Professor of Chemistry at Northwestern University (Western Samoa, 1971–1974)
- Mavis Sanders, senior research scholar of Black Children and Families at Child Trends (Papua New Guinea 1987–1989)
- Michael J. Snarskis, late American professor of archaeology at the University of Costa Rica (Costa Rica 1967–1969)
- Dorothy Vellenga, American socioloigist, Africanist (Ghana, 1961–1963)
- R. David Zorc, American linguist (Philippines 1965–1969)

== Government ==
=== Cabinet-level officials ===
- Donna Shalala, 18th U.S. Secretary of Health and Human Services (1993–2001), former U.S. Representative from FL-27 (2019–2021), former President of the Clinton Foundation (2015–2017), 5th President of the University of Miami (2001–2015), 5th Chancellor of the University of Wisconsin–Madison (1988–1993) and 10th President of Hunter College (1980–1988) (Iran 1962–1964)

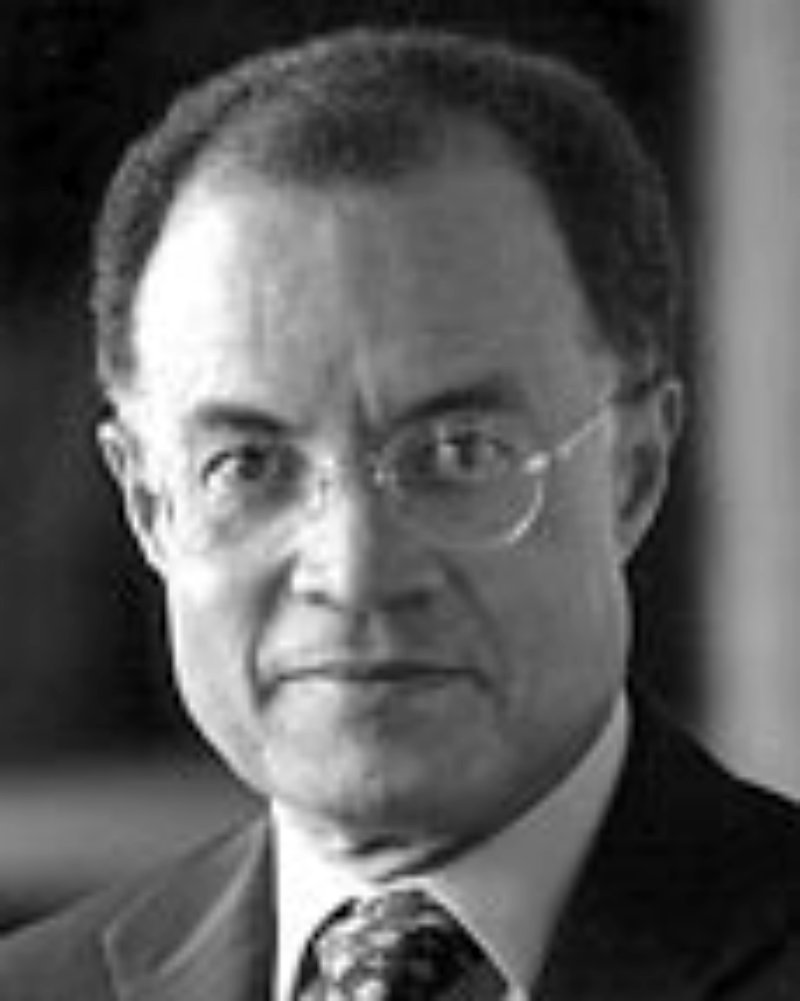
Drew S. Days III, 40th Solicitor General of the United States (Honduras 1967–69)

=== Executive branch ===
- Drew S. Days III, 40th Solicitor General of the United States and first African American Assistant Attorney General for the Civil Rights Division (Honduras 1967–1969)
- M. Peter McPherson, served as a special assistant to President Gerald Ford, administrator of USAID (Peru 1965–1966)
- Timothy Kraft, former White House Director of Political Affairs (1978–1979) and retired political consultant (Guatemala 1963–1964)
- John T. Morton, former director of U.S. Immigration and Customs Enforcement (Chad)
- Peter Navarro, former director of the Office of Trade and Manufacturing Policy, former director of the White House National Trade Council and proponent of the Green Bay Sweep in the attempt to overturn the 2020 election (Thailand 1973–1976)
- Robert Pastor, former member of the U.S. National Security Council (Malaysia 1970–1972)

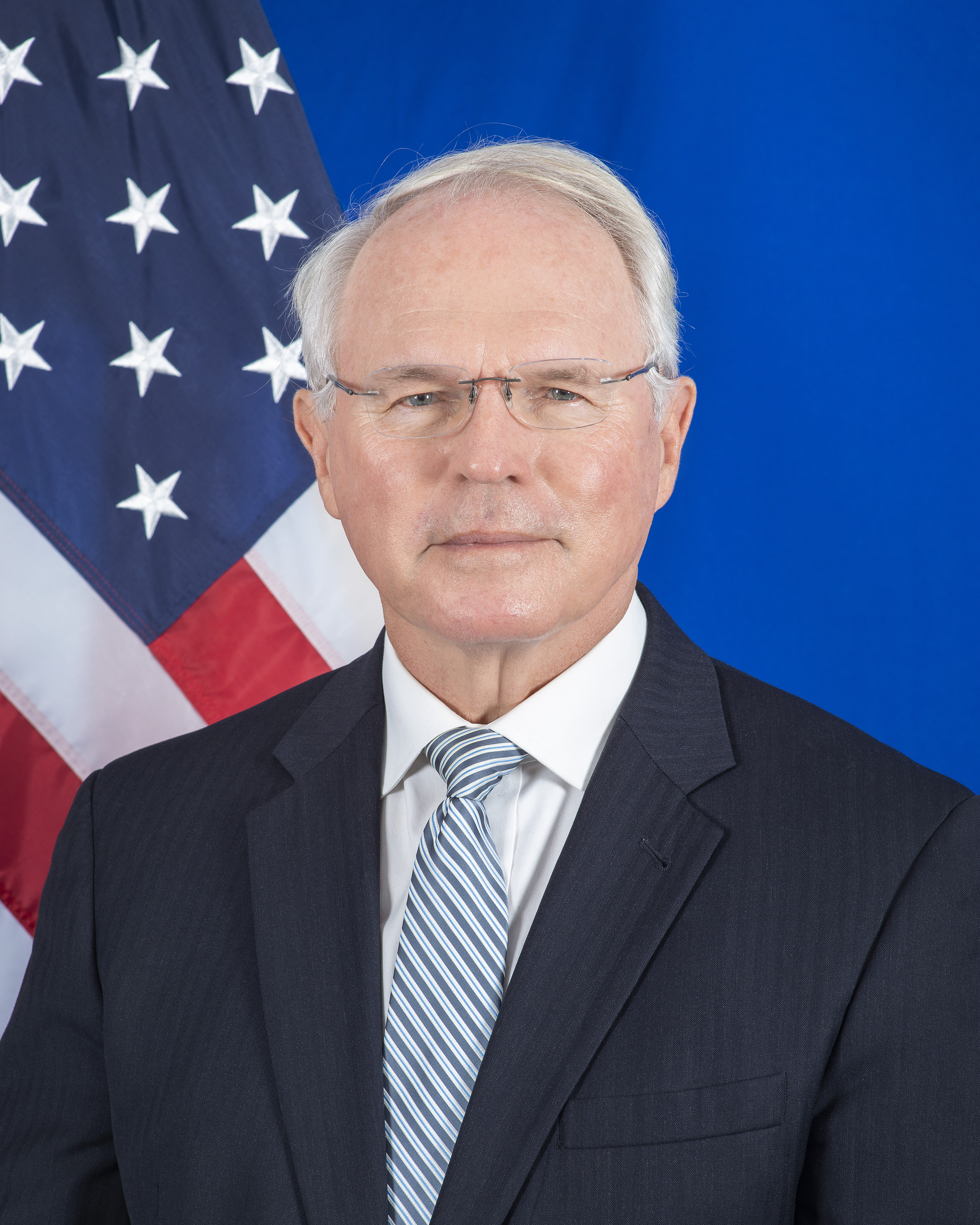
Christopher R. Hill, U.S. Ambassador to Serbia (Cameroon 1974–76)

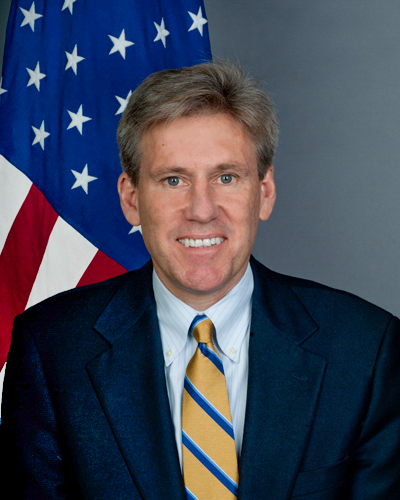
J. Christopher Stevens, former U.S. Ambassador to Libya (Morocco 1983–85)

=== Foreign service ===
- Gina Abercrombie-Winstanley, former U.S. Ambassador to Malta (Oman)
- Charles C. Adams Jr., former U.S. Ambassador to Finland (Kenya 1968–1970)
- Angela P. Aggeler, U.S. Ambassador to North Macedonia (Central African Republic 1987-1989)
- Frank Almaguer, former U.S. Ambassador to Honduras (Belize 1967–1969)
- Michael R. Arietti, former U.S. Ambassador to Rwanda (India)
- Larry Edward André Jr, former U.S. Ambassador to Somalia, Djibouti, and Mauritania (Senegal)
- Robert Blackwill, former U.S. Ambassador to India and United States National Security Council Deputy for Iraq at the beginning of the Iraq War (Malawi 1964–1966)
- Julia Chang Bloch, former U.S. Ambassador to Nepal and the first U.S. ambassador of Asian descent (Malaysia)
- Richard Boucher, American diplomat who served as the Deputy Secretary-General of the Organization for Economic Co-operation and Development (OECD) (Senegal, 1973–1975)
- Johnnie Carson, former Ambassador to Kenya (Tanzania)
- Michael Corbin, former U.S. Ambassador to the United Arab Emirates and former Chargé d'Affaires to Syria (Mauritania 1982–1984)
- Joseph R. Donovan Jr., former U.S. Ambassador to Indonesia (Korea)
- Laurence Foley, American diplomat who was assassinated outside his home in Amman, Jordan (India)
- Robert Gelbard, former U.S. Ambassador to Bolivia and former U.S. Ambassador to Indonesia (Bolivia)
- Gordon Gray III, former U.S. Ambassador to Tunisia (Morocco 1978–1980)
- Robert E. Gribbin III, former U.S. Ambassador to Rwanda and the Central African Republic (Kenya 1968–1970)
- Ken Hackett, former U.S. Ambassador to the Holy See and former president of Catholic Relief Services (Ghana 1968–1971)
- Christopher R. Hill, U.S. Ambassador to Serbia, former U.S. Ambassador to Iraq, South Korea, Poland, and Macedonia, former acting U.S. Ambassador to Albania (Cameroon 1974–1976)
- Vicki Huddleston, former U.S. Ambassador to Mali and Madagascar (Peru 1964–1966)
- Edmund Hull, former U.S. Ambassador to Yemen (Tunisia, 1987–1990)
- Darryl N. Johnson, former U.S. Ambassador to Thailand and Lithuania (Thailand 1962–1965)
- John Limbert, former U.S. Ambassador to Mauritania and hostage in the Iran hostage crisis (Iran 1964–1966)
- Donald Lu, former Assistant Secretary of State for South and Central Asian Affairs, former United States Ambassador to Kyrgyzstan and former United States Ambassador to Albania (Sierra Leone)
- Michael A. McCarthy, former U.S. Ambassador to Liberia (Togo)
- Larry L. Palmer, former U.S. Ambassador to Barbados and the Eastern Caribbean States and former U.S. Ambassador to Honduras (Liberia 1971–1973)
- Jonathan Pratt, former U.S. Ambassador to Djibouti (Guinea-Bissau)
- Stephen Schwartz, former U.S. Ambassador to Somalia (Cameroon 1981–1983)
- Kathleen Stephens, former U.S. Ambassador to South Korea and former Chargé d'Affaires to India (South Korea, 1975–1977)
- J. Christopher Stevens, former U.S. Ambassador to Libya who was killed in the 2012 Benghazi attack (Morocco 1983–1985)
- Victor L. Tomseth, former U.S. Ambassador to Laos and hostage in the Iran hostage crisis (Nepal 1964–1965)
- Mark Toner, former U.S. Ambassador to Liberia and former Spokesperson for the U.S. Department of State (Liberia)
- Kent Wiedemann, former U.S. Ambassador to Cambodia (Micronesia)

Sarah Parker, former Chief Justice of the North Carolina Supreme Court (Turkey 1964–66)

=== Law ===
- Daniel Foley, former Judge of the Hawaii Intermediate Court of Appeals and Associate Justice of the Supreme Court of Palau (Lesotho 1969–1970)
- Jim Gray, American jurist and writer, former presiding judge of the Superior Court of Orange County, California and vice presidential nominee for the Libertarian Party in 2012 (Costa Rica 1966–1968)
- Sarah Parker, former Chief Justice of the North Carolina Supreme Court (Turkey 1964–1966)

=== Municipal and local officials ===
- Chris Beutler, former mayor of Lincoln, Nebraska (Turkey 1966–1967)
- Thomas J. Murphy Jr., former mayor of Pittsburgh, Pennsylvania (Paraguay 1970–1972)
- Kitty Piercy, former mayor of Eugene, Oregon (Ethiopia 1964–1966)
- Rodger Randle, former mayor of Tulsa, Oklahoma (Brazil 1962–1964)

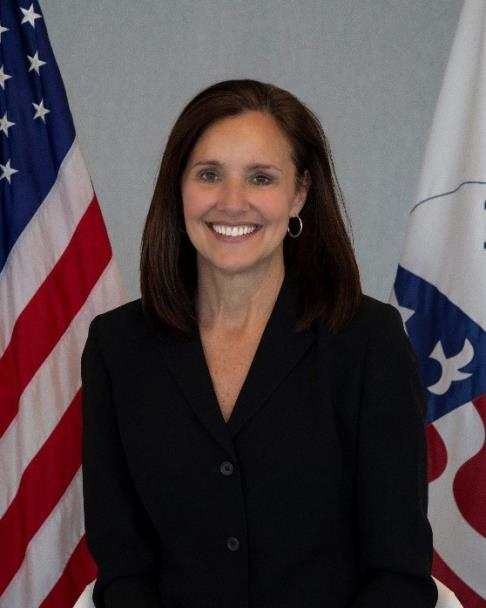
Carol Spahn, 21st Director of The Peace Corps (Romania 1994–96)

=== Peace Corps directors ===
- Carol Spahn, 21st Director of The Peace Corps (Romania 1994–1996)
- Jody Olsen, 20th Director of the Peace Corps (Tunisia 1966–1968)
- Carrie Hessler-Radelet, 19th Director of the Peace Corps, (Western Samoa 1981–1984)
- Aaron S. Williams, 18th Director of the Peace Corps, (Dominican Republic, 1967–1970)
- Ron Tschetter, 17th Director of The Peace Corps (India 1966–1968)
- Mark Schneider, 15th Director of the Peace Corps, senior vice president of International Crisis Group (El Salvador 1966–1968)
- Carol Bellamy, 13th Director of the Peace Corps, former head of UNESCO, president of World Learning (Guatemala 1963–1965)

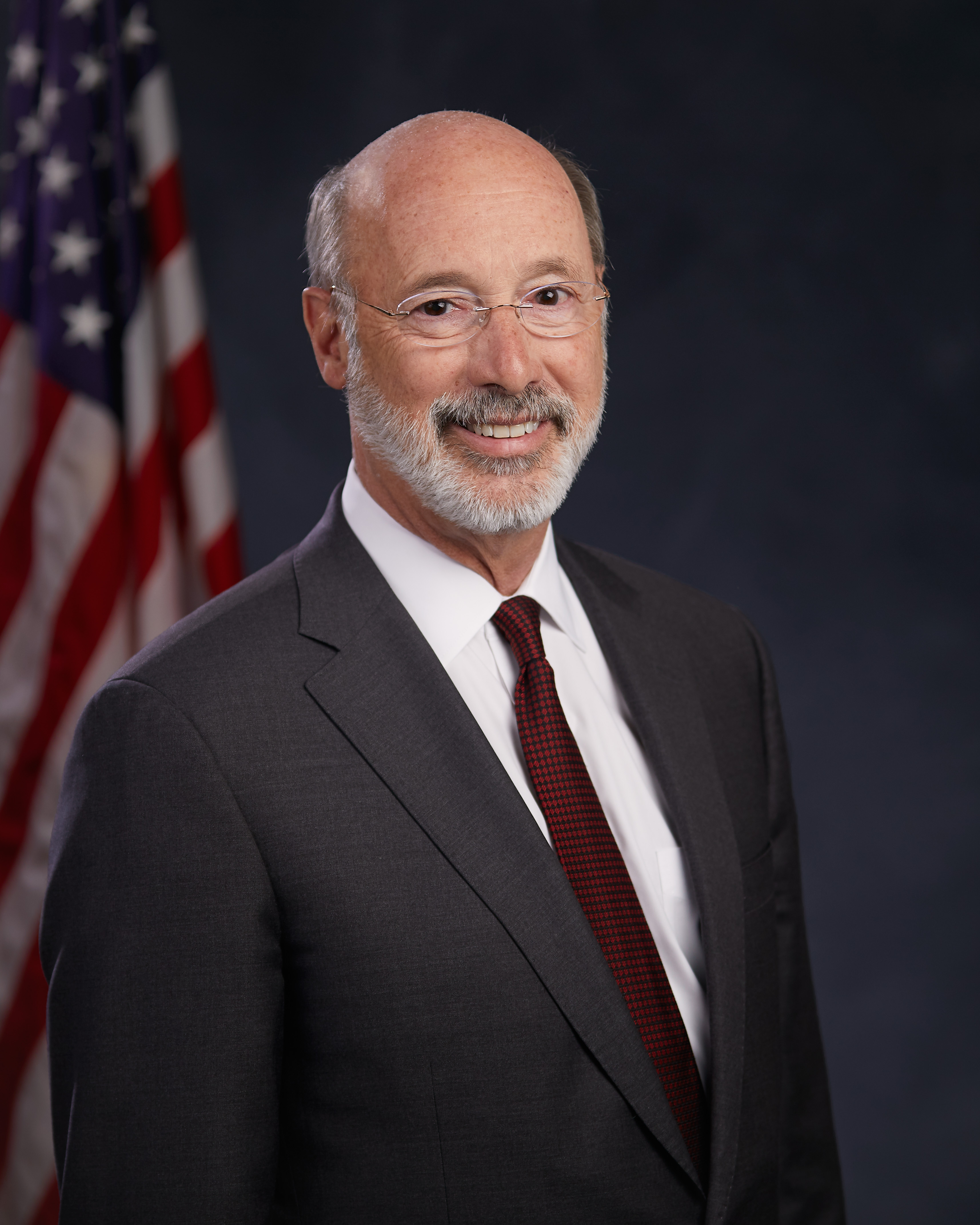
Tom Wolf, 47th Governor of Pennsylvania (India 1969–71)

=== Governors ===
- Jim Doyle, 44th Governor of Wisconsin and 41st Attorney General of Wisconsin (Tunisia 1967–1969)
- Bob Taft, 67th Governor of Ohio and 49th Secretary of State of Ohio (Tanzania 1963–1965)
- Tom Wolf, 47th Governor of Pennsylvania (India 1969–1971)

=== State legislators ===
- Jason Carter, former Georgia State Senator from the 42nd district, Democratic nominee for Governor of Georgia in 2014, and grandson of President Jimmy Carter (South Africa 1997–1999)
- Michael A. Rice, former Rhode Island State Representative from the 35th district (Philippines 1981–1985)

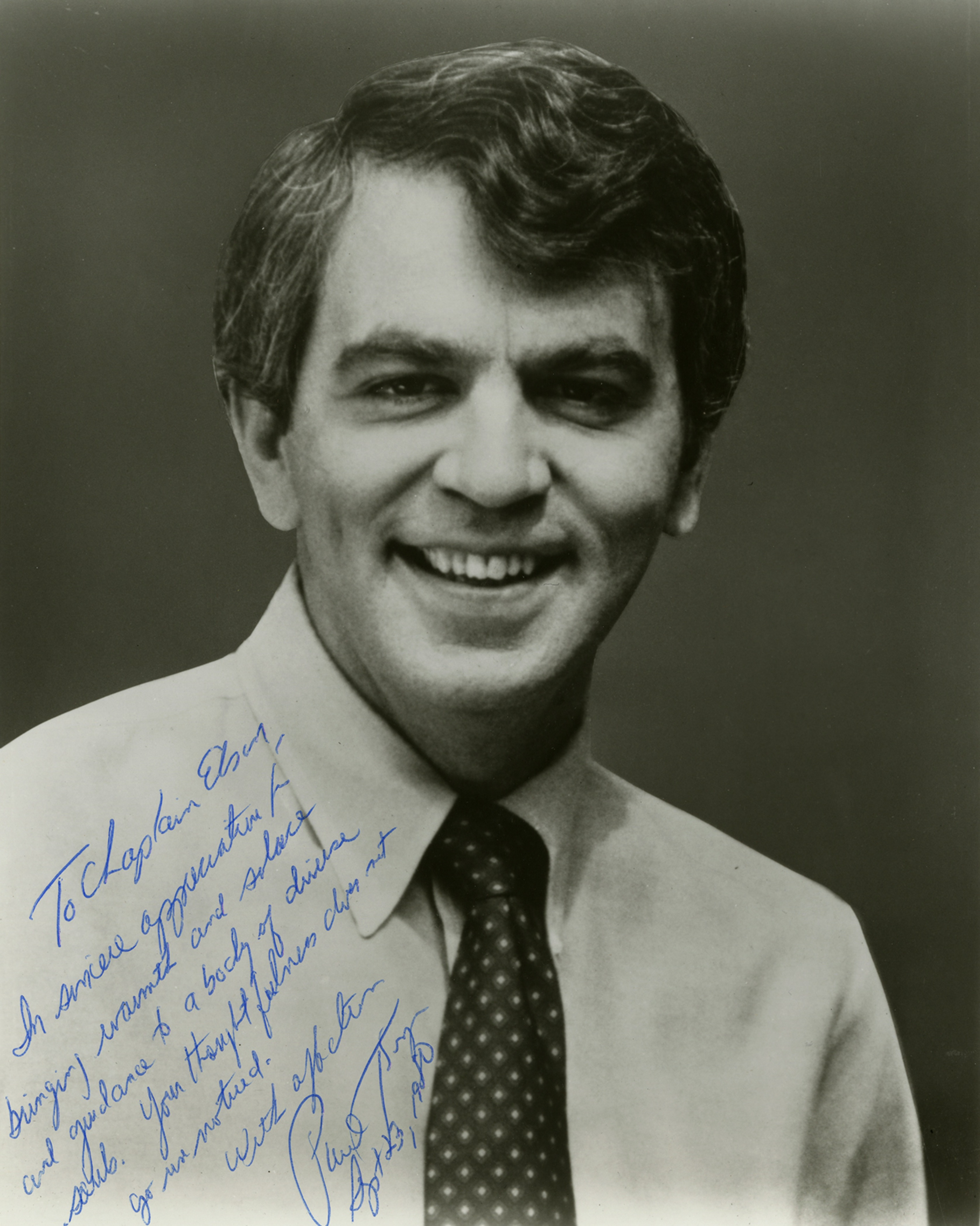
Paul Tsongas, former U.S. Senator from Massachusetts and candidate for U.S. President in 1992 (Ethiopia 1962–64)

=== U.S. senators ===
- Christopher Dodd, former U.S. Senator from Connecticut (Dominican Republic 1966–1968)
- Paul Tsongas, former U.S. Senator from Massachusetts and candidate for U.S. President in 1992 (Ethiopia 1962–1964)

=== U.S. representatives ===
- Jim Courter, NJ-12 (1983–1991) and NJ-13 (1979–1983) (Venezuela 1967–1969)
- Steve Driehaus, OH-01 (2009–2011) (Senegal 1988–1990)
- Sam Farr, CA-20 (2013–17) and CA-17 (1993–2013) (Colombia 1964–66)
- John Garamendi, CA-08 (Since 2023), formerly CA-03 (2013–2023) and CA-10 (2009–2013) (Ethiopia 1966–68)
- Tony P. Hall, OH-03 (1979–2002) and 7th U.S. Ambassador to United Nations Agencies for Food and Agriculture (Thailand 1966–67)
- Paul B. Henry, MI-03 (1993) and MI-05 (1985–1993) (Liberia and Ethiopia 1963–65)
- Mike Honda, CA-15 (2013–2017) and CA-17 (2001–2013) (El Salvador 1965–1967)
- Joe Kennedy III, MA-04 (2013–2021), former U.S. Special Envoy for Northern Ireland (2022–2024), and grandnephew of President John F. Kennedy (Dominican Republic 2004–2006)
- Thomas Petri, WI–06 (1979–2015) (Somalia 1966–1967)
- Christopher Shays, CT-04 (1987–2009) (Fiji 1968–1970)
- James Walsh, NY-25 (1993–2009) and NY-27 (1989–1993) (Nepal 1970–1972)
- Mike Ward, KY-03 (1995–1997) (The Gambia 1978–1979)

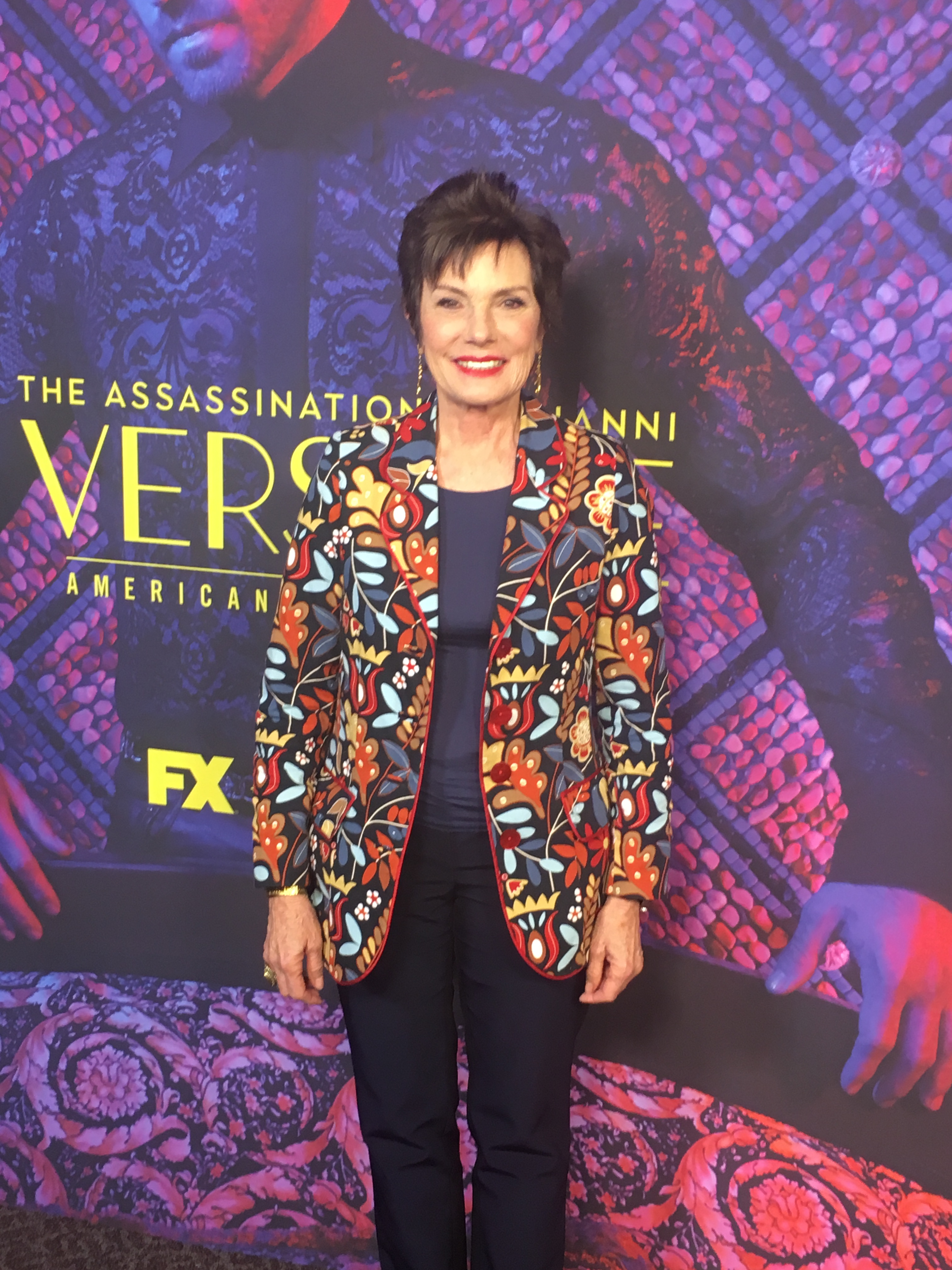
Maureen Orth, American journalist, author, and special correspondent for Vanity Fair magazine (Colombia, 1964–66)

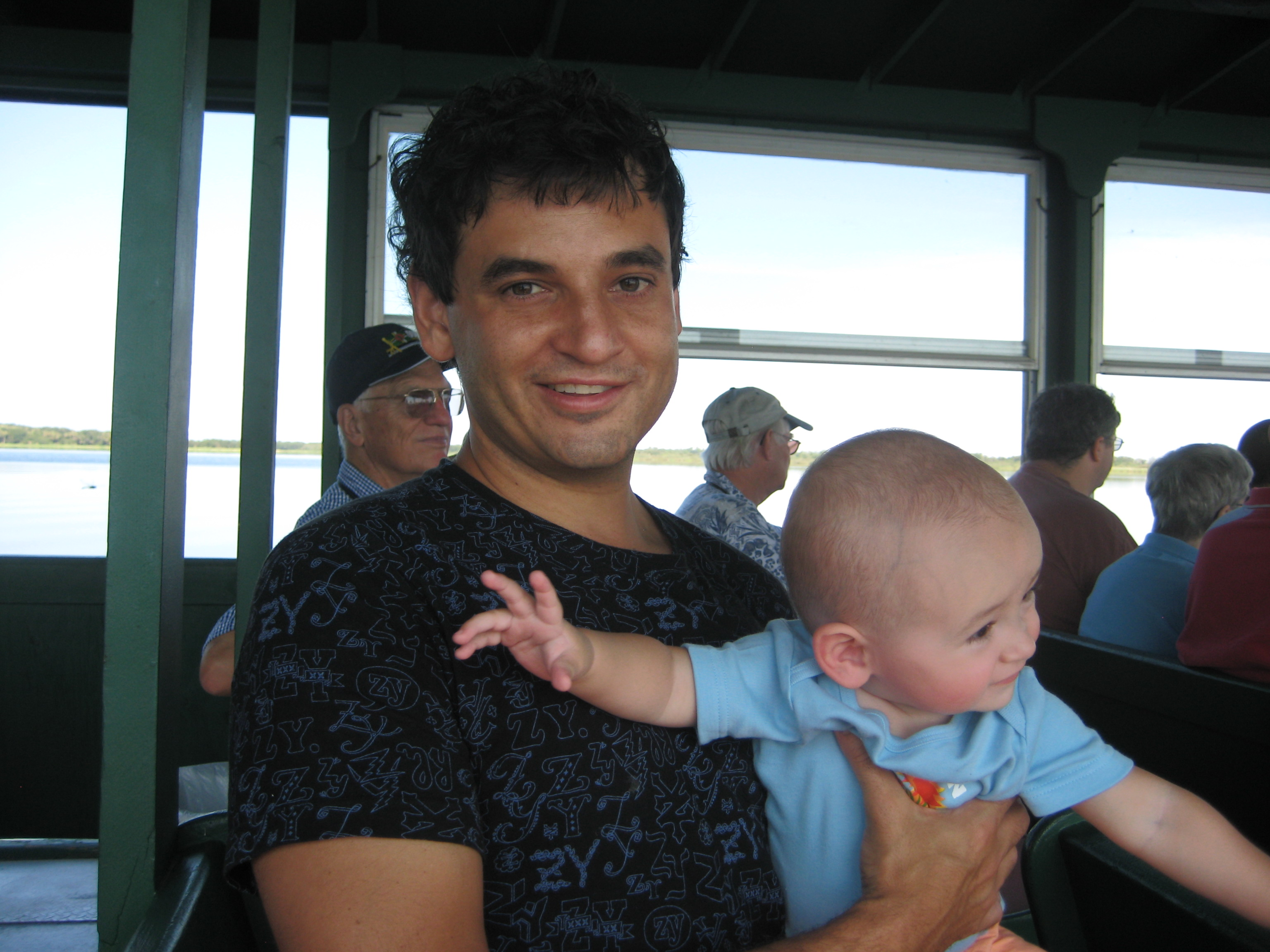
Tony D'Souza, American novelist, journalist, essayist, and reviewer (India 1966–68, Côte d'Ivoire 2001–02)

== Journalists ==
- T. D. Allman, American author, historian and journalist (Nepal 1966–1968)
- Ben Bradlee Jr., American journalist and writer, supervised the Pulitzer Prize-winning investigation into the sexual abuse scandal in the Roman Catholic Archdiocese of Boston (Afghanistan 1970–1972)
- Leon Dash, Pulitzer Prize winning reporter for the Washington Post (Kenya 1969–1970)
- Peter Hessler, American writer and journalist (China 1996–1997)
- Arnold Hano, late American editor, novelist, biographer and journalist (Costa Rica 1991–1993)
- Laurence Leamer, American author and journalist (Nepal 1964–1966)
- Maureen Orth, American journalist, author, and special correspondent for Vanity Fair magazine (Colombia, 1964–1966)
- George Packer, American journalist, novelist, and playwright, known for The Assassins' Gate: America in Iraq (Togo 1982–1983)
- Tony D'Souza, American novelist, journalist, essayist, and reviewer (India 1966–1968, Côte d'Ivoire 2001–2002)

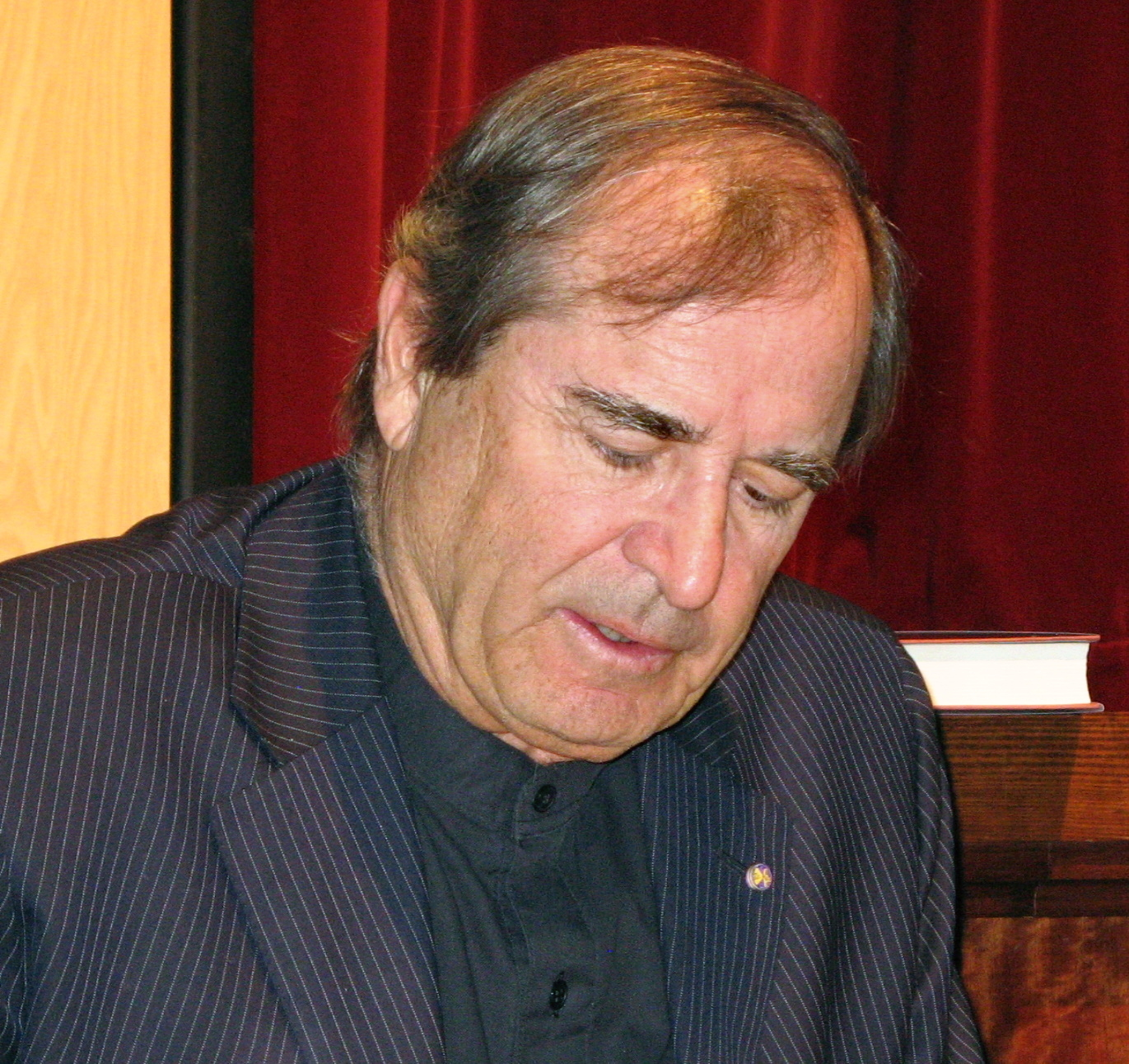
Paul Theroux, author of Waldo, Jungle Lovers, Mosquito Coast and The Great Railway Bazaar (Malawi 1963–65)

== Literature and non-fiction ==
- Howard Ashman, American playwright and lyricist (Burkina Faso)
- Stefanie DeLeo, American author, playwright, actress, director, and teacher (South Africa 2007–2009)
- Kent Haruf, author of The Tie That Binds, received the Whiting Award and a special Hemingway Foundation/PEN citation (Turkey 1966–1968)
- George B. Hutchinson, author of In Search of Nella Larsen (Burkina Faso 1975–1977)
- Roland Merullo, author of Leaving Losapas, In Revere, In Those Days, and Breakfast with Buddha (Micronesia 1979–1980)
- Charles Murray, American Libertarian political scientist, author, and columnist, known for Losing Ground: American Social Policy 1950–1980 and The Bell Curve (Thailand 1965–1968)
- John Perkins, author of Confessions of an Economic Hit Man (Ecuador 1968–1970)
- Bob Shacochis, author of Easy in the Island, recipient of the American Book Award (Eastern Caribbean 1975–1976)
- Gene Stone, author of The Bush Survival Bible and The Trump Survival Guide (Niger 1974–1976)
- Mark T. Sullivan, author of mystery novels, known for collaborations with James Patterson (Niger)
- Mildred D. Taylor, author of Roll of Thunder, Hear My Cry, awarded the 1977 Newbery Medal (Ethiopia 1965–1967)
- Paul Theroux, author of Waldo, Jungle Lovers, Mosquito Coast and The Great Railway Bazaar (Malawi 1963–1965)
- Moritz Thomsen, author of Living Poor (Ecuador 1963–1965)
- Bruce Watson, author of Freedom Summer and Sacco and Vanzetti (Costa Rica 1985–1987)
- Richard Wiley, author of Ahmed's Revenge and Soldiers in Hiding, PEN/Faulkner Award recipient (Korea 1967–1969)

== Music ==
- Kinky Friedman, Texas singer, songwriter, novelist, politician (Malaysia 1967–1969)
- Mary Kim Joh, Korean-American music composer, academic and medical research scientist. (Liberia 1977–1978)

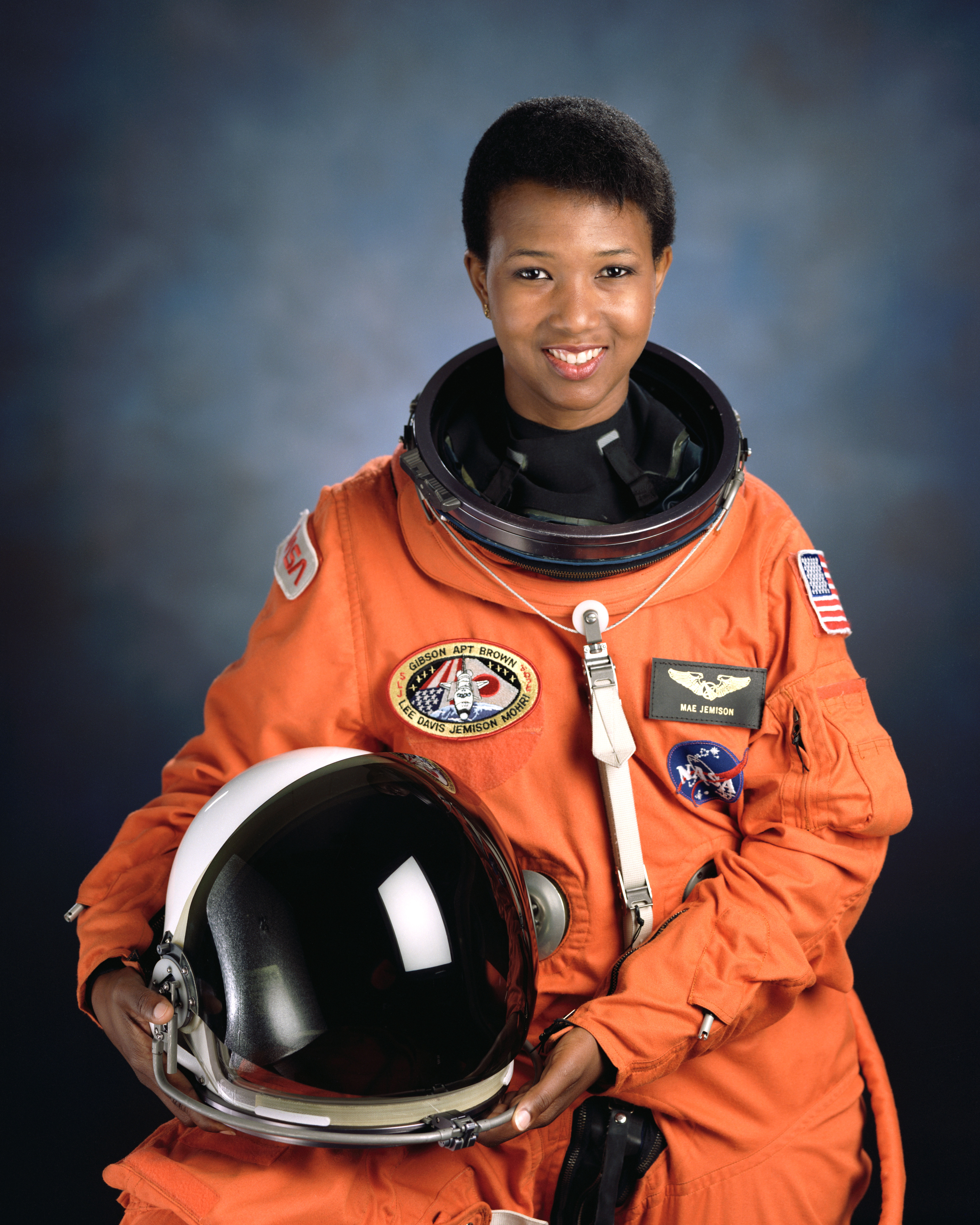
Mae Jemison, American engineer, physician and NASA astronaut (Sierra Leone and Liberia 1983–85)

== Science and medicine ==
- Joseph M. Acaba, American educator, hydrogeologist, and NASA astronaut (Dominican Republic 1994–1996)
- Kent Carpenter American marine biologist based in the Philippines (Philippines 1975-1978)
- Lillian Carter, nurse, mother of President Jimmy Carter (India 1966–1968)
- Gene Carl Feldman, oceanographer at NASA Goddard Space Flight Center (Western Samoa 1974–1977)
- Ina May Gaskin, Certified Professional Midwife, author, known as the "Mother of Modern Midwifery" (Malaysia 1963–1965)
- Mae Jemison, American engineer, physician and NASA astronaut (Sierra Leone and Liberia 1983–1985)
- Carle M. Pieters, American planetary scientist (Malaysia 1967–1969)

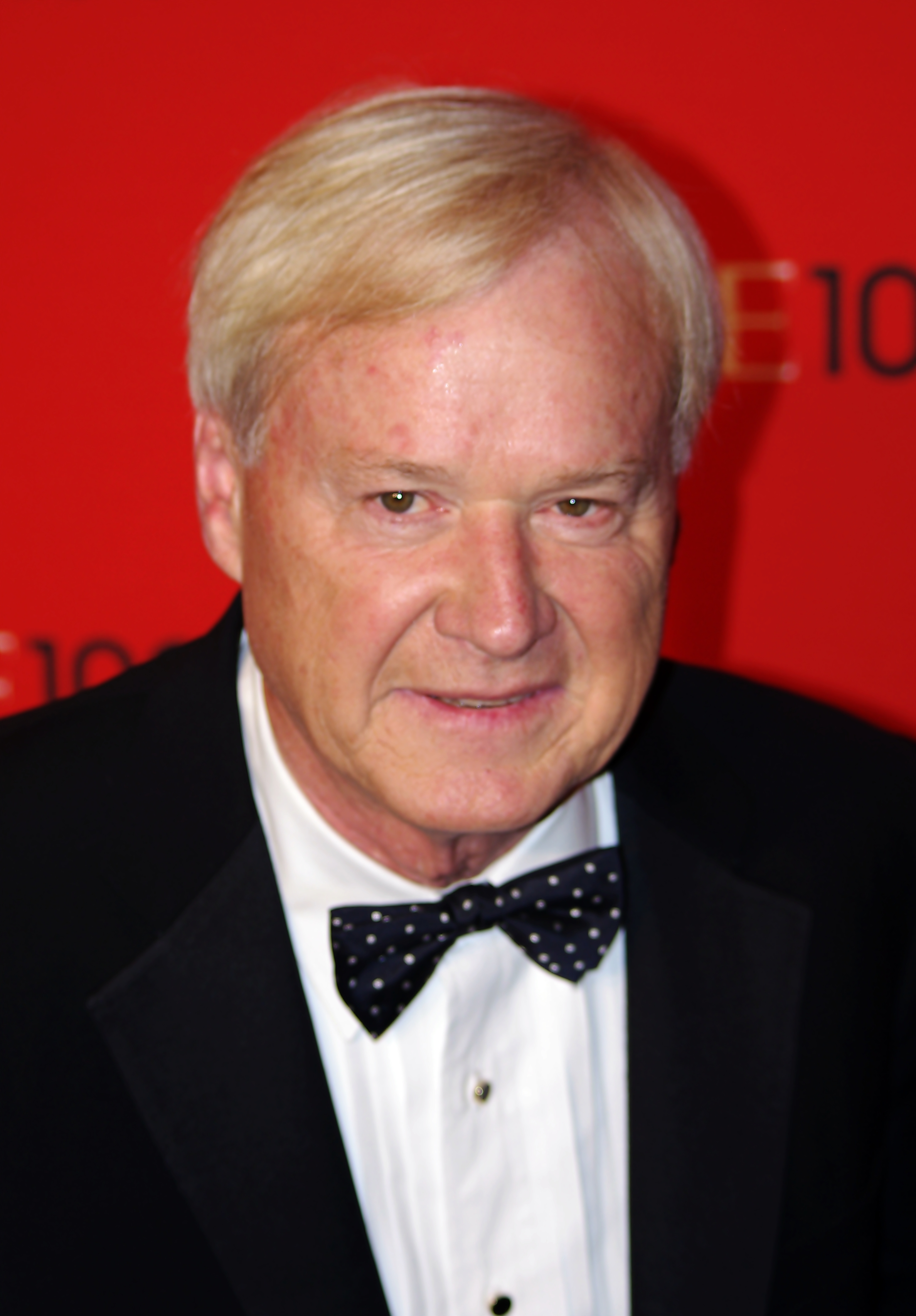
Chris Matthews, host of NBC's Hardball (Swaziland 1968–70)

== Television, film, theater, and radio ==
- Marissa Aroy, Filipino-American director and producer, directed the Emmy award-winning documentary Sikhs in America (Dominican Republic 1995–1997)
- Bob Beckel, late American political analyst and original co-host of The Five (Philippines 1971–1972)
- Taylor Hackford, American film director, former president of the Directors Guild of America, known for directing Ray, An Officer and a Gentleman and The Devil's Advocate (Bolivia 1968–1969)
- Judith Dwan Hallet, American documentary filmmaker (Tunisia 1964–1966)
- Rajiv Joseph, American playwright and 2010 Pulitzer Prize finalist (Senegal 1996–1998)
- Milt Kogan, American actor (Upper Volta 1970–1972)
- Cy Kuckenbaker, American filmmaker, video artist and professor (Lithuania 2000–2002)
- Chyna (born Joan Laurer), late American professional wrestler, bodybuilder, pornographic actress and television personality (Guatemala 1993–1995)
- Chris Matthews, American political commentator, retired talk show host, and author, known for hosting Hardball with Chris Matthews (Swaziland 1968–1970)
- Richard Sanders, American actor and screenwriter, known for his role as Les Nessman on WKRP in Cincinnati (Brazil 1966–1969)
- Bob Vila, American television show host, known for This Old House (Panama 1971–1973)
- Marco Werman, American radio personality and host of The World (Togo 1984–1987)

== See also ==
- National Peace Corps Association
