= Francis E. Putz =

American ecologist

Francis E. "Jack" Putz (born 23 March 1952) is an American ecologist and distinguished professor at the University of Florida, known for his research on climbing plants (lianas), tropical forest ecology, and sustainable forest management. He is a former president of the Association for Tropical Biology and Jefferson Science Fellow with the U.S. Agency for International Development.

== Education ==
Putz earned a bachelor's degree in Science Education from the University of Wisconsin in 1973. Prior to beginning graduate studies, he served as a Peace Corps Volunteer at the Forest Research Institute in Malaysia from 1973 to 1976.

He completed his Ph.D. in ecology at Cornell University in 1982 and held a NATO Postdoctoral Fellowship at the University of Oxford, where he conducted his research on tropical forestry.

== Career ==
Putz has been a faculty member at the University of Florida since 1982, where he became a Distinguished Professor in 2016.

He served as President of the Association for Tropical Biology in 1996 and was a Bullard Fellow at Harvard University in 2002. From 2004 to 2009, he held the Prince Bernhard Chair of International Conservation at Utrecht University in the Netherlands. He was the Senior Fulbright Research Fellow at Rhodes University in South Africa in 2006, Jefferson Science Fellow with the U.S. Agency for International Development (USAID) in Washington, D.C. and Indonesia from 2017 to 2018. He also held research professorship at the University of the Sunshine Coast in Australia from 2023 to 2026.

Putz was a senior associate with the Center for International Forestry Research (CIFOR) where he conducted research and policy discussions on sustainable tropical forest management and local capacity building in Africa, Southeast Asia, and Latin America.

== Research ==
His work integrates natural history, biomechanics, silviculture, savanna restoration, fire ecology, and conservation science, with a long-standing emphasis on managing tropical forests for biodiversity conservation, global climate change mitigation, and rural development.

Putz also focuses on the study of lianas (woody climbing plants). His early work on their natural history, abundance, and climbing strategies helped establish liana ecology as a distinct field within tropical forest science.

Putz's research on tropical forestry began with a focus on silviculture (applied forest ecology) but evolved into a broader, transdisciplinary approach that integrates ecology, economics, and policy.

In 1993, he introduced Reduced-Impact Logging (RIL) as a financially viable approach to lowering carbon emissions from timber harvests.

== Selected publications ==
=== Books and chapters ===
- Moro, J.C.; Putz, F.E. (April 19, 2018). Borneo Dammed: A Very Family Affair. Cypress Highlands Press of Florida. ISBN 978-1974429813.
- Putz, F.E (9 June 2022). From One Old Dog to Another. ISBN 979-8800810929.
- Putz, F.E (February 14, 2019). YAUPON WINS: An Ethnobotanical Novella. Cypress Highlands Press of Florida. p. 39. ISBN 978-1796754469.
- Putz, F. E; Mooney, H.A, eds. (1991). The Biology of vines. Cambridge ; New York: Cambridge University Press. doi:10.1017/CBO9780511897658. ISBN 978-0-521-39250-1.
- Putz, F.E (December 16, 2014). Finding Home in the Sandy Lands of the South: A Naturalist's Journey in Florida. Cypress Highlands Press of Florida. p. 130. ASIN B00R52OSWW.
- Schnitzer, S.A; Bongers, F.; Burnham, R. J; Putz, F.E, eds. (2015). The ecology of lianas. Chichester, West Sussex: John Wiley & Sons, Inc. ISBN 978-1-118-39249-2.
- Zarin, D. J; Alavalapati, J. R. R.; Putz, F. E; Schmink, M. (2005). Working Forests in the Neotropics: Conservation Through Sustainable Management?. Biology and Resource Management Series. New York: Columbia University Press. ISBN 978-0-231-12907-7.
- Putz, F.E; Thompson, I.D (2020). "Defining sustainable forest management in the tropics". In Blaser, J.; Hardcastle, P. D (eds.). Achieving sustainable management of tropical forests. Cambridge, UK: Burleigh Dodds Science Publishing. ISBN 9781786762481.
- Putz, F.E; Sirot, L.K; Pinard, M.A (2001). "Tropical forest management and wildlife: silvicultural effects on forest structure, fruit production, and locomotion of non-volant arboreal animals.". In Fimbel, R.; Grajal, A.; Robinson, J. (eds.). The Cutting Edge: Conserving Wildlife in Managed Tropical Forests. Columbia University Press. ISBN 9780231114547.

=== Journals ===
- Putz, F.E; Chan, H.T. (1986). "Tree growth, dynamics, and productivity in a mature mangrove forest in Malaysia". Forest Ecology and Management. 17 (2–3): 211–230. Bibcode:1986ForEM..17..211P. doi:10.1016/0378-1127(86)90113-1. ISSN 0378-1127.
- Putz, F.E; Romero, C; Sist, P; Schwartz, G; Thompson, I; Roopsind, A; Ruslandi; Medjibe, V; Ellis, P (2022-07-01). Bayer, Edward (ed.). "Sustained timber yield claims, considerations, and tradeoffs for selectively logged forests". PNAS Nexus. 1 (3) pgac102. doi:10.1093/pnasnexus/pgac102. ISSN 2752-6542. PMC 10468026. PMID 37654970.
- Putz, F. E; Cayetano, D.T; Belair, Ethan; P.E, Peter; W.R, Anand; G, Bronson; W.F, Catherine; F, Alex; C, Percival; P.R, Claudia (2023). "Liana cutting in selectively logged forests increases both carbon sequestration and timber yields". Forest Ecology and Management. 539 121038. Bibcode:2023ForEM.53921038P. doi:10.1016/j.foreco.2023.121038.
- Putz, F.E (2025). "Stop disregarding tropical forest management as a conservation option". Trees, Forests and People. 22 101007. Bibcode:2025TFP....2201007P. doi:10.1016/j.tfp.2025.101007.

== See also ==
Reduced-impact logging
