= New York Cares =

US non-profit organization

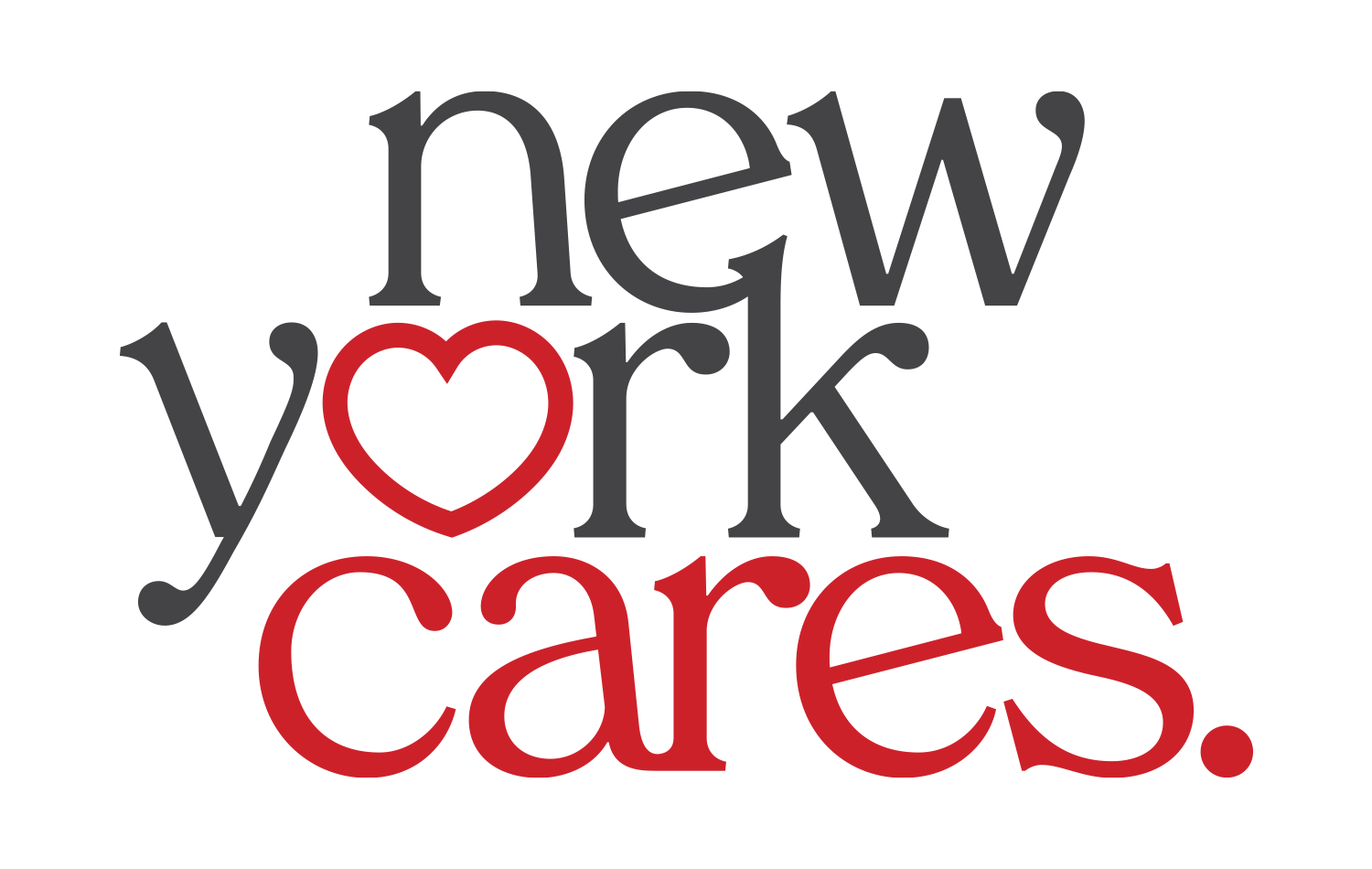
- Company type: Non-profit
- Industry: Nonprofit
- Founded: 1987; 39 years ago
- Headquarters: New York City, New York, U.S.
- Key people: Sapreet K. Saluja, ED Gary Bagley, Former ED Kathleen Behrens, Former ED
- Products: Volunteer Management
- Revenue: 11,189,762 United States dollar (2017)
- Total assets: 10,727,239 United States dollar (2022)
- Website: newyorkcares.org

New York Cares is a nonprofit organization focused on volunteer management. It was founded by a group of New York residents in 1987 who wanted a centralized way to organize efforts and access communities in New York City.

New York Cares is the largest volunteer network in New York City. The organization works with a base of 30,000 volunteers, and has engaged volunteers in over 8 million hours of service since its inception. New York Cares works with about 1,300 nonprofits and schools, and aims to improve education, meet immediate needs, and revitalize public spaces throughout NYC. The organization plans and manages about 1,600 volunteer projects each month.

Since its inception, New York Cares has provided over 70 million meals to New Yorkers in need.

New York Cares is a member of the Hands On Network and the Points of Light Foundation.

== Signature programs ==
The New York Cares Coat Drive is a popular holiday philanthropic tradition due to the iconic 'Shivering Statue of Liberty' image employed in its marketing materials. Since launching the Coat Drive in 1989, New York Cares has collected and distributed over 2.5 million coats to people in need.In 2023, New York Cares mobilized 23,250 volunteers to distribute 73,111 coats, serving over 300 nonprofits and schools.

The organization's Winter Wishes program provides holiday gifts to New Yorkers in need each year who might otherwise receive little or nothing for the holidays. Children and teens write letters to New York Cares, which then gives the letters to individuals who buy gifts for those who request them. In 2022, New York Cares granted 14,875 Winter Wishes.

New York Cares' Stand With Students campaign is a yearlong initiative to provide NYC public school students with academic, social-emotional, and supplemental programs that address learning gaps and historic inequities. Through the Stand With Students campaign, New York Cares has distributed over 50,000 backpacks filled with school supplies to NYC public school students.

== In popular culture ==
The organization is referenced in the chorus of the song "NYC" by the American rock band Interpol.
