= WorldMap =

Web platform

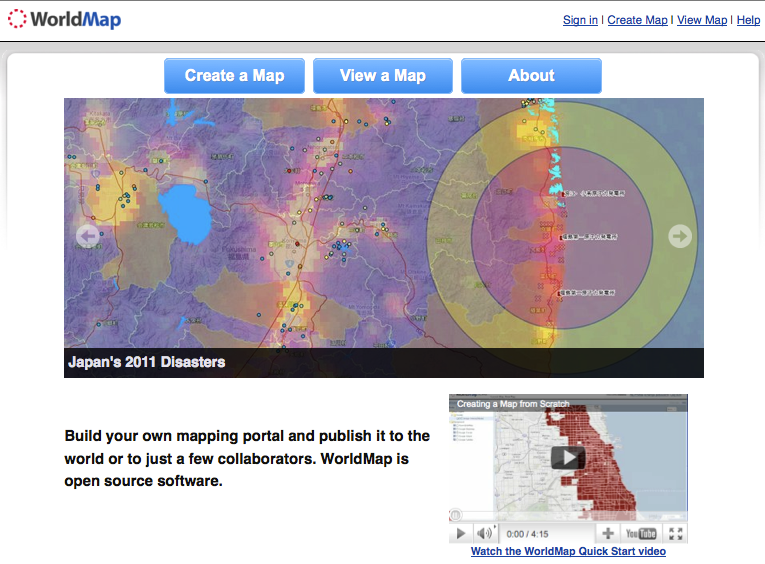
- WorldMap, the Center for Geographic Analysis, Harvard University
- Website: worldmap.harvard.edu

WorldMap is a web platform for creating, displaying, analyzing, and searching spatial data and other data forms across multiple disciplines.

WorldMap is a collaboratively edited, multilingual, free internet mapping electronic media site open to everyone that is housed at the Center for Geographic Analysis at Harvard University and accessible at the WorldMap website makes it possible for those who are not experts in GIS and web mapping to explore, visualize, and share their research materials in a GIS spatial framework, enhancing their ability to conduct academic research, community service projects, and instructional activities. The WorldMap site allows users to add their own map layers and data sets, symbolize them, edit them, add overlays, add multimedia content (images, video, text), control access, and share or publish them.

The purposes of WorldMap are simple: to enable one to explore the development of human civilization in all its diversity and complexity in spatial data contexts, to take advantage of the knowledge of others to enhance one's particular interests, and to create a sustainable and scalable platform in which students, scholars, organizations, and ordinary citizens can participate in creating and sharing any work that can be usefully represented spatially.

== Overview ==
Worldmap is an open-source and open access online platform for visualizing and sharing spatial data. Worldmap was launched in July 2011 by the Center for Geographic Analysis at Harvard University. The site was created following the success of the AfricaMap project here, that launched in beta version in November 2009 to bring together a range of cross-disciplinary materials on Africa, within an online mapping environment. AfricaMap demonstrated that there is a large amount of detailed mapping data on Africa that can be brought together in one place, that web technologies are mature enough to be able to handle a large volume of data (hundreds of gigabytes in this case), and that users can explore these data smoothly on top of high resolution imagery such as Google satellite view. WorldMap, in which AfricaMap is now located, has data that range from detailed street maps, to language and ethnicity groupings, historic and scholarly maps, environment, transportation systems, World Census and other demographic and economic data, political systems, institutions and infrastructure, urban planning, archaeology, cultural sites, crisis areas, and health and disease. AfricaMap also includes data from the Ibrahim Index of African Governance that allows users to display and analyze results along with other data. A searchable gazetteer in AfricaMap includes over 2 million place names readable in a multiplicity of languages.

From the outset, collaborations with other institutions interested in the potentials of the AfricaMap (and WorldMap) platform were sought. These encouraged the creation of new data and in some cases, direct links to other sites were employed to display of these data spatially in concert with additional data layers. These collaborations include, among others, the Trans-Atlantic Slave Trade Database at Emory University, the UNESCO World Heritage Sites, and social crisis mapping such as Ushahidi. In other cases, such as the ATLA Religion Database and the Human Relations Area Files at Yale University, associated data were first geo-referenced and then uploaded directly to the AfricaMap website. In still other cases available open source data were downloaded and entered into the system, as with a spatialized version of Wikipedia and various environmental and boundary data, or brought in from government and other sources, as in JapanMap which integrates detailed data on the 2005 tsunami among other things.

As a result, users creating maps within the WorldMap system now are able to draw on an array of global and local mapping data already brought into the system – environmental (rivers, soils, climate, eco-systems), sociological (population density, administrative boundaries), cultural (language, religion, ethnicity), historical (early maps, period mapping, trade routes), transportation systems, and health (U.S. and U.N. global census surveys, among others). Data uploaded to WorldMap by users often are made available by them to other users, encouraging collaborations and cross-disciplinary engagements employing the same resource data. In short, WorldMap grows Wiki-style as new data are added, with the creators of these data retaining editorial control.

WorldMap is being used by several organizations. The Institute of Advanced Studies at the United Nations University (the research arm of the U. N.) is addressing the illicit trade of flora and fauna in East Africa. A Newsweek/The Daily Beast project, “Get on the Map! For Women and Girls, is promoting Women in the World. The Virtue Foundation is mapping Global Health Data at the local level in Ghana. A non-profit music support group, “The Singing Wells,” in Nairobi, Kenya is helping to preserve and share East African Music. Virtual Kenya also has created an instance of Worldmap on their own site to explore environmental issues. Cornell University’s College of Human Ecology, under epidemiologist Julia Finkelstein, is developing a new WorldMap instance called GlobalHealthMap, based on the current WorldMap system but also interoperable with it.

== Technology ==
WorldMap is a federated system with collaborations in place already with an array of other universities and institutions and is based on a geospatial infrastructure platform developed by the Center for Geographic Analysis.

The WorldMap platform is built on open-source software so that the source code that makes it work can be examined, improved upon, and extended by researchers and developers around the world with new functionality often added rapidly at relatively low cost. WorldMap benefits from using mapping APIs such as Google, OpenStreetMap, Bing, National Geographic, and ESRI for providing general purpose map backdrops, but the system is not dependent on any particular web map API. WorldMap is hosted on Amazon’s EC2 cloud infrastructure.

The WorldMap platform uses an open-source software stack that is being improved and extended by geospatial developers in the US and abroad; The World Bank and the U.S. federal government are major contributors to core components of the WorldMap platform, specifically GeoNode and GeoServer. The fact that WorldMap is capable of supporting a large volume of data and a large number of users is due in part to the design of its servers that use caching, but also because its service-oriented-architecture allows data holdings to be distributed across many servers. The system handles a variety of spatial input formats including shapefile, GeoTIFF, web map services (WMS), ESRI REST services, georeferenced YouTube videos and Picasa photos, and GeoRSS feeds. A user can select several local or remote data layers to overlay and control the transparency of overlaid layers, allowing for visual investigations of spatial patterns and relationships between data sets. Images, video and text can also be added by users to their Worldmap projects through linked URLs to sites such as Flickr or uploads to the WorldMap site directly. Users also are encouraged to adopt an appropriate Creative Commons license to define the type of attribution.

Among the important recent projects created in World Map is TweetMap, developed in a collaboration between Todd Mostak and the Center for Geographic Analysis. This project supports Twitter storage, query, analysis, display, and download of massive Twitter geo-spatial data sets consisting of billions of features. The underlying platform, called MapD, works by parallelizing processes across commodity GPU cards, achieving speedups over traditional databases by a factor of a million using inexpensive hardware. Among other applications, TweetMap can be used for tracking earthquakes and epidemics such as influenza in real time.

== History ==
WorldMap has its origins in AfricaMap, a website begun in 2007 by art historian Suzanne Blier and GIS scientist Ben Lewis with Harvard University Provost funds in Innovative Computing and was designed and built in 2008 and 2009 by Ben Lewis of Harvard and Robert Cheetham of Azavia, with input from Blier and Sinologist Peter Bol, the Director of the Center for Geographic Analysis, to make a broad range of materials on Africa available within an online mapping environment. Lewis, who built the first peer-to-peer GIS system ROMap in 2001, had recently established the Geonomy Project with Scott Melby, from which AfricaMap's innovative technical features were based in part. These include a large searchable place name gazetteer overlaid on Google Maps, using tile services to display and query many very large layers simultaneously with transparency control and pre-cached tiles.

As users with varied interests saw how the initial AfricaMap site handled and displayed large sets of mapped data, they sought similar online mapping applications for their own research interests; out of this soon came Boston Research Map (sociology), VermontMap (geology), ParisMap (history) and ChinaMap (history and political science). To meet the needs of these diverse new projects, and to add new capabilities, the decision was made to build a more general system that anyone in the world could use to create their own custom mapping applications and load their own data. By July 2011 the system had been redesigned from scratch by Ben Lewis and Matt Bertrand with many new collaborative capabilities, and re-launched as WorldMap.

AfricaMap has its origins in an earlier on-line mapping and media project called The Baobab Project (Baobab: Roots of Creativity in African Material Culture), founded by Blier at Harvard in 1993 with a grant from the Seaver Institute. Baobab, designed by Michael Roy as an interactive website, included an image and ethnographic database based on GIS, along with narrative-form case studies framed around questions concerning the social roots of creativity (why certain cultures, places, and periods encouraged creativity and innovation in the arts). Multi-media case studies on the now defunct site, described as "one of the largest academic studies of African art" addressed a variety of themes ranging from Islam and art to architectural planning.

== Accuracy of content and quality ==
Paper maps and online mapping projects such as Google Earth are carefully and deliberately created by experts, conveying accuracy even if mediated through political agendas and time. Conversely, WorldMap base mapping and projects may lack source data or include factual inaccuracies and misrepresentations. Some of this is encouraged, as for example the inclusion of ethnicity maps that are known to have biases and inaccuracies based in part on the fact that people's identities are complex and constantly shifting, rarely conforming to precisely configured spaces. For this reason WorldMap includes sometimes multiple different renderings of the same kinds of information so that users can pick and chose between them - or create their own. As a consequence of its open structure, WorldMap cannot guarantee the accuracy of its content or source data, although users are encouraged to enter and cite data as accurately as possible. In order to improve the system, WorldMap is developing a crowd-sourced application that will allow users to rank mapping data in the system and to comment on it.

At the same time, WorldMap has become part of several scholarly book publications, and so is also part of a larger review process: Jill Lepore on the New York Conspiracy of 1741 as well as Colin Gordon on St. Louis Neighborhoods and Robert Sampson on Chicago neighborhoods.

Other sources:

- Introducing the WorldMap in the Google Maps Mania blog (21 January 2012). Retrieved on 14 January 2013.
- Lewis, B. WorldMap: a strategy to allow researchers to scratch their itches online thereby improving data access for all Washington, D.C. (2011). Retrieved on 14 January 2013.
- What is the Spatial Turn? GIS and the Historian College of William and Mary, Academic Technology Blog (20 November 2011). Retrieved on 14 January 2013.
- Five for Friday: Cool Maps Made on WorldMap National Geographic Education Blog (23 September 2011). Retrieved on 14 January 2013.
