= Suzanne Blier =

American art historian

Suzanne Preston Blier
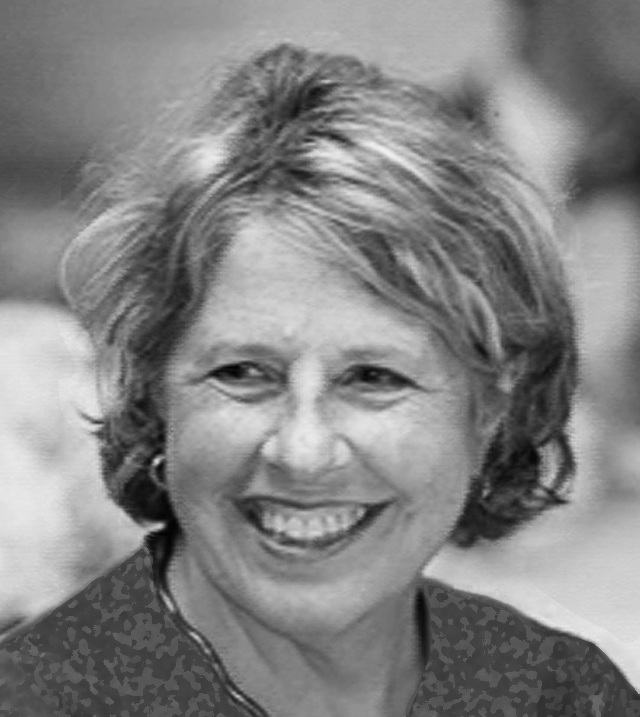
- Born: Burlington, Vermont, United States
- Occupations: Art Historian; Professor

Academic background
- Education: University of Vermont; Columbia University

Academic work
- Notable students: Cécile Fromont

Suzanne Preston Blier is an American art historian who is the Allen Whitehill Clowes Professor of Fine Arts and Professor of African and African American Studies at Harvard University. She is appointed in both the History of Art and Architecture department and the department of African and African American studies.

She is a faculty associate at the Weatherhead Center for International Affairs. Her work focuses primarily on African art, architecture, and culture.

== Early life and education ==
Blier attended Burlington High School. She received her B.A. in art history from the University of Vermont in 1973. She later received her M.A. (1976) and Ph.D. in art history and archaeology (1981), both from Columbia University.

Blier's interest in African art began when she served as a Peace Corps volunteer, from 1969 to 1971 in Savé, a Yoruba center in Dahomey (now Benin Republic).

== Career ==
She began her professorial career at Vassar College serving as a lecturer from 1979 to 1981. She taught at Northwestern University from 1981 to 1983. In 1983, she began work at her alma mater, Columbia University as an assistant professor. In 1988, she was tenured at Colombia and later became full professor.

She remained at Columbia until 1993, subsequently transferring to teach at Harvard University. In 1988, she was awarded a Guggenheim Fellowship. Other fellowships have included the American Council of Learned Societies, the National Endowment for the Humanities, and the Institute for Advanced Study in Princeton New Jersey as well as the Getty Research Institute in Los Angeles, Ca. (twice), the Center for Advanced Study in the Visual Arts (CASVA) in Washington, D.C., and the Clark Art Institute in Williamstown, Ma. In 2022, she was named a fellow of the American Academy of Arts and Sciences.

In 2023, Blier published The History of African Art, that addresses the art across the continent in a series of chronologically-framed chapters for the publisher Thames and Hudson's Art Essentials series. Another 2023 book by Blier, The Streets of Newtowne: A Story of Cambridge, MA (Imagine and Wonder Publications) describes the diversity of the city's from its indigenous origins to today. The book includes a section co-authored with a member of the Massachusett Tribal Council. For this work, Blier received a 2023 Preservation Award from the Cambridge Historical Commission which "celebrates outstanding projects and notable individuals who conserve and protect the city's architecture and history."

Blier's 2019 book, Picasso's Demoiselles, the Untold Origins of a Modern Masterpiece, won the 2020 Robert Motherwell Award for an outstanding publication in the history and criticism of modernism in the arts by the Dedalus Foundation. The citation reads in part: "This book uncovers the previously unknown history of Pablo Picasso's Les Demoiselles d’Avignon, one of the twentieth century's most important, celebrated, and studied paintings....In this profoundly insightful work, Blier fundamentally transforms what we know about this revolutionary and iconic work." The book also was a 2019 Wall Street Journal holiday art book selection and was also honored as one of the best books of 2020 by the Art Forum. In addition the book was a finalist for the 2020 PROSE Award in Art History and Criticism, granted annually in recognition of the best in professional and scholarly publishing. Blier's 2019 book also featured in the 2023 Art in American overview "The 8 Most Essential Books to Read About Pablo Picasso" by art critic and editor, Alex Greenberger. The other four authors cited in this overview include poet and novelist Gertrude Stein, Artist and Picasso partner Françoise Gilot (and co-author Carlton Lake), Picasso bibliographer John Richardson (four books), historian Annie Cohen-Solal. Greenberger points out that Blier's "that Les Demoiselles d’Avignon can’t be considered simply a painting of five female sex workers. Pointing out that African masks inspired Picasso’s depiction of these women, Blier writes that Picasso's Demoiselles d'Avignon is "...consistent with the larger colonial world that Picasso and his friends inhabited. Her feminist analysis involves viewing the titular demoiselles as more than sex objects. She also explores what African art meant to white Europeans like Picasso, whose encounters with work from afar were often bound by the walls of museums that cared little for their holdings’ original context."

In 2017, Blier's book Art and Risk in Ancient Yoruba: Ife History, Politics, and Identity c.1300, won this PROSE award in the same Art History and Criticism category. Her 2004 book, Butabu: Adobe Architecture of West Africa, with photographs by James Morris, was named a "Best of Year" book selection by the Washington Post and was selected by the New York Times Book Review for inclusion in its Holiday Selection that year. Another of Blier's books, The Royal Arts of Africa (1998), a Choice Award winner, has been translated into five languages and is a leading textbook in the field; it was reissued in 2012. Her 1995 book titled African Vodun: Art, Psychology, and Power won the 1997 Charles Rufus Morey Book Prize awarded by the College Art Association for an outstanding publication in art history and was a finalist for the Melville J. Herskovits Award of the African Studies Association. Blier's 1987 book, The Anatomy of Architecture: Ontology and Metaphor in Batammaliba Architectural Expression, won the 1989 Arnold Rubin Outstanding Publication Award presented by ACASA (Arts Council of the African Studies Association).

Blier's scholarship has appeared in magazines, journals, and edited volumes, including African Arts, Journal of African History, American Journal of Semiotics, Res: Anthropology and Art, and Journal of the Society of Architectural Historiansand The Art Bulletin. In 2018 her chapter, "The African urban past: Historical Perspectives on the Metropolis," appearing in David Adjaye’s African Metropolitan Architecture (2011 and 2018 Rizzoli) was selected for inclusion in the Getty Conservation Institute’s publication: Historic Cities: Issues in Urban Conservation (Spring 2019), a volume identified as a collection of "classic" texts that have been influential in the history of thinking and practice in the field of urban conservation. In 2015 Homme Blanc/Homme Noir: Impressions d'Afrique which includes Blier's "L'Afrique et l'Occident: une introduction," received the Prix International du Livre d'Art Tribal.

In 2011, two of her articles, "Imaging Otherness in Ivory: African Portrayals of the Portuguese ca. 1492" and "Kings, Crowns and Rights of Succession: Obalufon Arts in Ife and Other Yoruba Centers" were selected for inclusion in The Centennial Anthology of the Art Bulletin comprising the 33 top articles over the journal's 100-year history. In 2014 Blier published an essay on the importance of African Art in the Art Museum.

Blier's interests in mapping led to the creation of the electronic media project, Baobab: Sources and Studies in African Visual Culture (also known as "The Baobab Project"). This project was established at Harvard in 1993 and funded by the Seaver Institute. It represented one of the largest academic studies of African art. The interactive website included images and an ethnographic database based on GIS, along with narrative-form case studies framed around the questions concerning the social roots of creativity. Topics included the coexistence of traditional art and Islam, African political expansion in relation to style, and art variables in the ancient Yoruba city-state. This Baobab Project led to the creation of AfricaMap in 2007, a website that seeks to bring together the best available cartographic data on the continent in an interactive GIS format. In 2011, the AfricaMap website, housed at Harvard's Center for Geographic Research, was expanded into WorldMap along with an array of other map types. In 2013, Blier and Peter Bol received a Digital Humanities Implementation Grant Award to enhance this website with their project, "Extending WorldMap to Make It Easier for Humanists and Others to Find, Use, and Publish Geospatial Information."

Blier was a member of the National Committee for the History of Art and was the 43rd president of the College Art Association (CAA), the national association of Artists, Art Historians, and Designers from 2016-2018. She chairs CAA's Committee of Scholarship and Research (2020-). A member of CAA's board from 2012 to 2018, Blier was vice president for publications (2013–15) and vice president of Annual Conference (2015–16), and has been on task forces for the development of CAA's Code of Best Practices in Fair Use for the Visual Arts, the Guidelines for the Evaluation of Digital Scholarship in Art and Art History and Guidelines on the Importance of Documenting the Historical Context of Objects and Sites. She also chaired the 2015-16 task force on the Annual Conference that instituted key changes to this recurring event and chaired the 2016-2018 task force on Governance that spearheaded important changes in the association's name, branding, and Board nomination processes. Blier's involvement in CAA spans several decades. She was originally on the board from 1989 to 1994. She was a member of the Art Bulletin Editorial Board from 2003 to 2007, serving one year as chair, and participated on the juries for CAA's Distinguished Lifetime Achievement Award for Writing on Art (2004–6) and Charles Rufus Morey Book Award (2009–11). Blier also helped to shape CAA's Strategic Plan 2015–2020 and, in her role as vice president, chaired both the Annual Conference Committee and the 2016 task force that brought significant changes to the Annual Conference organization and structure. Blier has been on the board of directors of the Society of Architectural Historians. In 2022 she was elected to the American Academy of Arts and Sciences.

In 2018 she was honored with a Yoruba chieftaincy title in Nigeria, Otun Yeye Obalufon, in partial recognition of her scholarship on ancient Ife art. In 2019 Blier received an honorary Doctor of Letters degree from the University of Vermont in recognition of her scholarship in African art and her leadership in online mapping. In 2022 she was honored as a special Yoruba ambassador. In June 2023 she was honored with "Profile in Citizenship" commendation by the Peace Corps.

== Activism ==
Blier is president of both the Cambridge Citizens Coalition and the Harvard Square Neighborhood Association, two groups in Cambridge, Massachusetts. She has opposed efforts to relax current zoning and permitting requirements which would allow building higher density housing up to six stories tall. Proponents argue that the zoning changes are necessary to bring in more affordable housing to Cambridge amidst a shortage of housing. The Cambridge Citizens Coalition argues that the zoning changes would "...take away the guardrails that make sure we have some control over what our streets look like."

In 2020, she criticized a policy change, the Affordable Housing Overlay, which would developers to exceed existing height limits for buildings if 100% of the units in those buildings were affordable housing. Blier said that the policy "carries major risks. No comparable plan is enacted elsewhere, much less a deeply historical urban center like Cambridge (founded in 1630) with its rich architectural legacy." In 2024, she described a proposal to eliminate single-family exclusive zoning as "radical and irresponsible" and "I fear that Cambridge will become the new Robert Moses."

== Works ==
- Beauty and Beast: A Study in Contrasts, 1976, ISBN 1253299854
- Africa's Cross River (Art of the Nigerian Cameroon Border Redefined), 1980, ISBN B000N90BM0
- Gestures in African Art, 1982, ISBN B0006EBIHE
- The Anatomy of Architecture: Ontology and Metaphor in Batammaliba Architectural Expression, 1987, ISBN 978-0226058610
- African Vodun: Art, Psychology, and Power, 1995, ISBN 978-0226058603
- Royal Arts Of Africa: The Majesty of Form, 1998, ISBN 978-0810927056
- A History of Art in Africa, co-author, 2000, ISBN 0134421876
- Butabu: Adobe Architecture of West Africa, 2003, ISBN 978-1568984131
- Art of the Senses, with Edmund Gaither and Michael Kan, 2004, ISBN 978-0878466597
- Royal Arts of Africa, 2012, ISBN 978-1856691130
- Art and Risk in Ancient Yoruba: Ife History, Power, and Identity, c.1300, 2015, ISBN 978-1107021662
- The Image of the Black in African and Asian Art, with David Bindman and Henry Louis Gates, Jr., 2017, ISBN 978-0674504394
- Art of Jazz: Form/Performance/Notes, with David Bindman and Vera Ingrid Grant, 2017, ISBN 978-0674980266
- Asen: Mémoires de fer forgé: Art vodun du Danhomè, 2019, ISBN 978-2825802892
- Picasso's Demoiselles: The Untold Origins of a Modern Masterpiece, 2019, ISBN 978-1478000198
- The History of African Art. 2023. ISBN 978-0-500-29625-7
- The Streets of Newtowne: A Story of Cambridge, MA, 2023, ISBN 978-1637610756
