= Dorothy Vellenga =

American educator

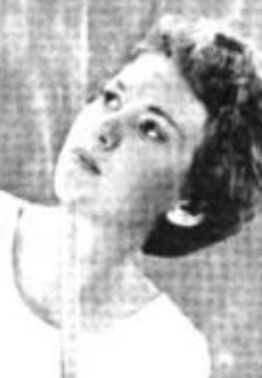
- Dorothy Dee Vellenga, from a 1961 publication of the United States Department of State
- Born: February 22, 1937; Ohio
- Died: October 3, 1984 (aged 47); Raleigh, North Carolina
- Citizenship: United States of America
- Education: Monmouth College, Columbia University
- Occupations: Educator, college professor, sociologist
- Known for: Academic research regarding women in Africa
- Notable work: "The Widow among the Matrilineal Akan of Southern Ghana" in Betty Potash, ed., Widows in African Societies: Choices and Constraints (Stanford University Press 1986)

Dorothy Dee Vellenga (February 22, 1937 – October 3, 1984) was an American educator, college professor and sociologist, specializing in African studies. She was in the first cohort of Peace Corps volunteers when she first went to Ghana in 1961.

== Early life and education ==
Vellenga was born in Ohio, the daughter of Simon John Vellenga and Alice Roosevelt Evans Vellenga. Her father was a college chemistry professor and her mother was a teacher. She earned a bachelor's degree in biology from Monmouth College in Illinois in 1959. On a Ford Foundation International Fellowship, she pursued graduate studies in sociology at Columbia University, and made research trips to Ghana for her doctoral dissertation, titled "Changing sex roles and social tensions in Ghana: The law as measure and mediator of family conflicts" (1975). She also earned a certificate in African Studies at Columbia.

== Career ==
Vellenga taught biology and chemistry at the Foxcroft School in Virginia from 1959 to 1961. She joined the new Peace Corps program, and went to teach biology in Accra, Ghana, from 1961 to 1963. After completing doctoral studies, she taught at Ripon College for a year, then joined the faculty at Muskingum College in 1971.

From 1974 to 1976, she returned to Ghana for further research on women in agriculture, especially in the cocoa industry, and did archival research in London and Basel, funded by a Social Science Research Council fellowship. "In Ghana, people do not live in isolated sectors of the society—one traditional, one modern (if, indeed, they do anywhere), but in increasingly interconnected spheres," she wrote in 1971.

Vellenga spoke to community and campus groups about her experiences in Ghana. She was treasurer for the Ohio Coalition for the Implementation of the Equal Rights Amendment, active in the local chapter of the League of Women Voters, and raised funds for the Southeastern Ohio Symphony Orchestra.

== Publications ==
Besides her own research publications, Vellenga wrote reviews for Journal of Asian and African Studies, Social Forces, and The International Journal of Comparative Sociology.

- "Attempts to Change the Marriage Laws in Ghana and the Ivory Coast" (1971)
- "Differentiation among Women Farmers in Two Rural Areas in Ghana" (1977)
- "Who is a Wife? Legal Expressions of Heterosexual Conflicts in Ghana" (1983)
- "Racial and Ethnic Conflict in a Christian Missionary Community: Jamaican and Swiss-German Missionaries in the Basel Mission in Gold Coast in the Mid-Nineteenth Century" (1983)
- "Women, Households, and Food Commodity Chains in Southern Ghana: Contradictions between the Search for Profit and the Struggle for Survival" (1985)
- "The Widow among the Matrilineal Akan of Southern Ghana" (1986)

== Personal life and legacy ==
Vellenga was in a serious car accident in 1957. She died from cancer in 1984, at the age of 47, in Raleigh, North Carolina. Muskingum College offers a Dorothy D. Vellenga Award in Sociology, to a junior student studying sociology.
