= Reduced-impact logging =

Forestry practice aiming at sustainability

Reduced-Impact Logging (RIL) is a set of forestry practices which enable sustainability within tropical selective felling forestry. RIL is intensively planned and carefully controlled timber harvesting conducted by trained workers in ways that minimize the deleterious impacts of logging.

Selective logging is a widely common timber-harvesting practice that involves the removal of few timbers species trees above a minimum diameter cutting limit. It is estimated that selective logging worldwide concerns 1 billion hectares of forests including 680 million hectares of tropical forests species. Unlike clearcutting, where all trees in an area are felled, selective logging leaves the remaining trees in the stand. Selective logging plays a crucial role in the achievement of sustainable forest management practices. Its impacts depend a lot on the harvesting techniques employed and the amount of damage involved will have important consequences on the capacity of the forest to regenerate.

Where forests are selectively logged by untrained and poorly supervised workers at intensities and frequencies that do not sustain timber yields, this causes high damage to the forest stand, hydrological functions and biodiversity. Selective logging is justifiably referred as conventional or even predatory selective logging. Very early on, foresters have been trying to introduce harvesting techniques that caused as little damage as possible to the forest stand, soil and water system. However, the term 'Reduced Impact' better known now under its acronym RIL was raised only in the late 1990s.

== History ==
Prior to World War II, logging in tropical forests was primarily manual, with minimal environmental impacts due to extremely low harvest intensities. Early efforts to transform timber exploitation into forest management, such as Sir Dietrich Brandis's teak management system in Burma, emphasized careful logging to preserve future timber resources. Despite this and other efforts, the post-war economic boom fueled a surge in global demands for tropical timber, leading to widespread and mostly uncontrolled industrial logging. Mechanized logging substantially expanded the scales and intensities of harvest operations, raising concerns about the increasingly degraded state of forests.

By the early 1990s, it became evident that mechanized logging posed serious threats to long-term sustainability, particularly when considering non-timber values. Evidence was also accumulating that logging is among the world's most dangerous occupations. In response, the concept of RIL emerged to mitigate environmental damage while meeting timber needs. While most of the recommended RIL practices have long been known soon after the term was introduced, RIL gained acceptance and legitimacy, resonating with both foresters and environmental organizations.

RIL (also known as reduced-impact harvesting, RIH or low-impact logging, LIL) has its roots in a long-standing recognition of the detrimental environmental effects of unplanned and so-called conventional logging. RIL is basically a set of recommended practices for selectively harvesting trees in a planned and controlled way by trained workers to minimize harm to the forest and risks to the workers. Despite advocacy for better logging practices by experts over the decades, widespread adoption of RIL remains adopted by only a small number of nations who legislate for this in their national forest standard such as Gabon, Republic of Congo and Guyana. There are pockets of sustainable RIL forestry in other tropical nations, proven by certification through Forest Stewardship Council (FSC) and Programme for the Endorsement of Forest Certification (PEFC).

The core principles of RIL involve a series of pre- and post-logging guidelines designed to minimize damage to forests and ecosystems. These guidelines include measures such as pre-harvest planning of skid trails and log yards, directional felling, and post-logging closure operations to mitigate soil damage and maintain ecosystem processes. Accumulating research has demonstrated the effectiveness of RIL techniques in reducing stand and soil damage compared to conventional logging.

Influential publications and initiatives by organizations such as the Tropical Forest Foundation (TFF), the International Tropical Timber Organization (ITTO), and the Food and Agriculture Organization (FAO) have played a significant role in the development of codes of practice for logging in tropical forests. In 1996, FAO published a model code of forest harvesting practice, which served as a guiding framework for many tropical countries to develop their own codes. These efforts aimed to promote sustainable forest management and reduce the environmental impacts of logging provided the groundwork for adoption of RIL practices globally. Despite progress in promoting RIL, challenges persist in achieving widespread adoption due to economic constraints, the lack of market demand for certified RIL timbers, and the continued influence of conventional logging norms. However, RIL remains a substantial step toward sustainable forest management and certification bodies such as FSC and PEFC are recognized as commercial vehicles towards ensuring RIL and sustainable forestry.

== Management ==
RIL is a set of timber harvesting practices primarily focused on minimizing environmental damage. Its key goal is to harvest timber responsibly while also ensuring worker safety and preserving the forest for future use. Developed guidelines, influenced by initiatives like those from Australia and the FAO, have been tailored for various tropical regions, such as Asia-Pacific, Brazil, Malaysia, Indonesia, and West and Central Africa.

The core of RIL involves accurate forest inventories followed by careful planning and management practices to sustain forest ecosystems. These practices include assigning forest management units and coupes, excluding sensible areas (steep slopes, buffer zones around rivers and swamp areas) from logging, meticulously planning access roads and log landings, and conducting thorough post-harvest assessments. A critical aspect of RIL is the protection of future crop trees (FCTs), minimizing wood waste and ensuring worker safety, with specific practices varying with ecological conditions and logging techniques.

Key RIL practices include conducting detailed pre-harvest inventories that include marking FCTs, reducing soil damage especially on steep slopes, and cutting lianas well before harvesting to enhance safety and reduce stand damage. The FAO advocated for broader adoption of RIL by producing a model code of forest harvesting practice, which emphasizes several standard measures: defining a minimum cutting cycle of 20 years, limiting the removal of stand basal area to one-third, directional felling to facilitate log yarding, and limiting the size of log landings. Moreover, it recommends building access roads and cutting vines well in advance of harvesting, planning skid trails to minimize their impacts, performing logging activities only under favorable conditions such as dry soils, and providing thorough training for staff. Lastly, it stresses the importance of conducting post-harvest assessments to gauge the impacts and effectiveness of logging practices.

Despite these comprehensive guidelines, standardizing damage assessment methods across different regions remains a challenge, with ongoing efforts to enhance consistency and biological relevance in forest management practices.

== Ecology ==
Use of RIL practices results in fewer trees and less soil being damaged, but its benefits can be lost at very high logging intensities. What is crucial is that each country establishes its logging rate depending on density of species. There is not one blanket rule for logging levels in all tropical forests.

In Southeast Asia, researchers have provided evidence that when more than 8 trees per hectare are logged, the benefits of RIL are diminished and the impacts become similar to those from conventional logging. High logging intensities also affect the sustainability of timber yields, as removing too many trees leaves behind a forest with too few FCTs to maintain timber yields within the usual 25-35-year cycles in tropical forests; 60 years in Guyana for large concessions.

Forests in every part of the tropical region will vary in density of species. That is why RIL is so important and a uniform rule cannot be applied across all tropical areas as the species are different in the forest mix. Each forest needs to be looked at in its own right and evaluated by the growth rate of species within that forest. RIL and inventory planning ensures this by considering growth rates of each species in the mix.

The recovery of commercial timber volume after RIL depends substantially on how much damage the logging causes; heavily damaged areas often see a slower recovery because vines and fast-growing pioneer species dominate, which can hinder the growth of valuable timber trees. Biomass recovery is also slower when logging intensity is high, as more trees are destroyed or damaged, reducing the forest's ability to regenerate.

RIL techniques hold promise for minimizing the ecological damage from logging activities. Yet, understanding its impact on biodiversity remains limited, with emerging scientific evidence focusing on a few taxa. For example, there is evidence that RIL minimizes negative impacts on stream habitats, amphibian occupancy, and diversity compared to conventional logging (CL), while also facilitating faster recovery. Studies comparing RIL with CL have found limited evidence for major differences in biodiversity impacts, at least over the short term. As an example, a study in Guyana compared vertebrate populations in areas subjected to RIL and adjacent unlogged sites. While large frugivores such as primates were less abundant in RIL sites, smaller frugivores, granivores, folivores, and insectivores were more common. Three of the 15 vertebrate species examined changed in abundance, with two showing negative impacts due to RIL.

A meta-analysis revealed that species abundance shifts are smaller under RIL, with fewer detrimental effects on birds, arthropods, and mammals. The reduced impact is attributed to better logging practices, such as planned logging roads, pre-harvest inventories, and directional felling, which minimize forest damage. While forests subjected to low intensity RIL retain the overall structure and composition of unlogged stands, they typically do not fully recover to pre-logging levels of biodiversity. A meta-analysis showed that RIL can reduce tree damage compared to CL, its impacts on tree species richness vary with logging intensity. While RIL can reduce carbon emissions by enhancing logging efficiency and protecting sensitive habitats without sacrificing timber yields, its effects on biodiversity are less clear. Long-term effects on biodiversity are uncertain, necessitating further research with appropriate controls and long-term monitoring.

Despite uncertainties about its direct effects on biodiversity, RIL may indirectly contribute to biodiversity conservation by increasing the economic value of selectively logged forests. This could help prevent forest conversion to agricultural plantations, thereby preserving habitat for forest-dependent species. RIL may thus serve as a valuable conservation strategy in combating deforestation and habitat loss.

== Economy ==
RIL presents both challenges and opportunities from an economic perspective. Whether it imposes a financial burden on loggers remains a contentious issue, with concerns about reduced income and increased operational costs apparently hindering widespread adoption. Loggers transitioning to RIL often face the need for new equipment, safety measures, and trained personnel, which all add to operational expenses. On the other hand, there is also evidence that due to increased recovery of timber from felled trees and other efficiencies derived from planning and the professionalization of harvest crews, RIL can also be financially remunerative.

The economic viability of RIL compared to CL varies widely with factors such as forest conditions, terrain, labor practices, and timber markets. Studies have produced mixed results, with some showing RIL to be financially favorable due to reduced timber wastage, while others highlight potential losses, especially in areas with restrictions on harvesting.

=== Market access ===
Different stakeholders, including forest owners, timber companies, forest workers, and logging contractors, may have conflicting perspectives on the financial implications of RIL. Long-term consequences, such as environmental sustainability and worker safety, are often weighed differently by various parties.

While RIL guidelines are often designed with larger industrial operations in mind, they are also relevant for smallholder forestry. Smallholders can benefit from the reduced waste and increased safety that RIL promotes. However, some aspects of RIL may need to be adapted to meet the specific needs and constraints of smallholder operations. Tropical forests face increasing demands for timber, non-timber forest products (NTFPs), and ecosystem services. As a result, there is a pressing need for further exploration of alternative use regimes and a comprehensive assessment of the costs and benefits for forest-dependent communities.

Tools such as the RILSIM software package allow for detailed financial analysis of logging operations, aiding in decision-making and comparisons between RIL and CL. However, broader economic considerations, such as environmental benefits and externalities, are not always captured in traditional cost-benefit analyses.

Despite challenges, there are potential economic benefits to RIL, including increased carbon retention and eligibility for environmental service payments. As international markets for carbon, hydrological services, and biodiversity continue to develop, forests managed with RIL techniques may gain recognition and financial incentives for their conservation efforts.

The reduced-impact logging for climate change mitigation (RIL-C) protocol is an important method for monitoring carbon emissions from selective logging operations. Developed in response to concerns about climate change, the RIL-C methodology provides a standardized approach to measure carbon emissions caused by tree felling, skidding, and hauling. The protocol separates emissions from these activities, allowing for more precise measurement and monitoring. For example, studies have shown that adopting RIL-C can reduce logging emissions by up to 44%, primarily through changes such as narrower haul roads, improved skid trail planning, and better felling techniques.

The RIL-C approach is also relevant in the context of carbon markets and climate agreements like REDD+ and the Paris Climate Accord. Emission savings from RIL practices, monitored with the RIL-C protocol, can help countries achieve their climate change goals. These savings may also qualify for carbon payments, encouraging the adoption of sustainable practices. In Central Africa, implementation of the RIL-C protocol has shown that over 50% of logging emissions could be avoided without reducing timber yields. This makes RIL-C a practical approach for environmental conservation while supporting climate mitigation efforts.

== Organizations ==
This section highlights key institutions that have played a crucial role in developing guidelines for and promoting RIL.

=== Food and Agriculture Organization (FAO) ===
The FAO is a United Nations agency dedicated to agriculture, forestry, and fisheries. It was instrumental in developing the model code of forest harvesting practice for RIL, aiming to align harvesting techniques with sustainable forest management objectives. This effort enhances the compatibility of logging practices with the broader goals of sustainable development, thereby supporting both economic and social aims.

=== International Tropical Timber Organization (ITTO) ===
The ITTO is an intergovernmental agency dedicated to promoting the sustainable management of tropical forests and fostering international trade in tropical timber sourced from sustainably managed and legally harvested forests. ITTO has been instrumental in developing guidelines and principles for RIL to minimize environmental damage while maintaining economic viability. The organization assists member countries in adapting these RIL guidelines to local conditions through projects and capacity-building initiatives. Additionally, ITTO maintains a comprehensive database of RIL projects, providing valuable insights and data on the implementation and effects of these practices. It also focuses on implementing policy guidelines to support sustainable forest management and sustainable tropical timber trade, collects and disseminates data on tropical timber production and trade, promotes sustainable timber supply chains, and supports capacity building in tropical forestry.

=== Tropical Forest Foundation (TFF) ===
The TFF is an international non-profit educational NGO committed to tropical forest conservation through sustainable forestry practices. Recognized for its demonstration models and training courses, TFF specializes in teaching sustainable forest management principles, particularly RIL. In Southeast Asia and the Pacific, particularly Indonesia, TFF focuses on practical RIL training upon request, while also addressing legality, market connections, and certification support.

=== Association Technique Internationale des Bois Tropicaux (ATIBT) ===
The ATIBT promotes the sustainable management of tropical forests and responsible trade in tropical timber. ATIBT has conducted studies on RIL practices, particularly in the Congo Basin, and offers practical guidelines for companies. It works with timber companies, governments, and certification bodies to improve logging methods. Through its research, training, and publications, ATIBT helps raise awareness about sustainable forest management.
