= Cindy Marano =

American economic justice activist

- Born: 1947; Philadelphia, Pennsylvania, United States
- Died: April 28, 2005; San Francisco, California
- Occupation: Economic justice activist

Cindy Marano (1947 – April 28, 2005) was an economic justice activist from the United States. Marano worked for economic equity for women and low-income workers. She is a designated Women's History Month Honoree by the National Women's History Project, which described her as a "brilliant strategic thinker".

== Personal life and education ==
Cindy (Carty) Marano was born in Philadelphia in 1947 to Edgar and Grayce (Peggy) Carty. Her family moved frequently due to her father's work, and she attended nine different schools before she graduated high school. Cindy graduated from Downers Grove High School in 1965 where she won many honors. She was inspired by her 8th grade teacher and joined the Peace Corps in the 1960s, serving for two years in Ecuador. The work she did in Ecuador with poor women and children affected her deeply, and she would go on to establish a distribution network for the hand-woven goods the women made. She attended Northwestern University for two years. She went on to join the Peace Corps and served two years in Ecuador. She went on to George Mason University where she graduated in 1972 with a degree in English.

At the time of her death in 2005 from adenoid cystic carcinoma she lived in Oakland, California with her partner Judy Patrick. She was survived by her mother, her partner and brother Paul Carty and wife Joanne and their two children Timothy and Meghan Carty.

== Professional career ==
She lived in Washington, D.C. from 1969 until 1997. Upon arriving in Washington she was director of public affairs for the National Federation of Business and Professional Women until 1975. Starting in 1972 she served as director of the National Workforce Network and president of Wider Opportunities for Women. In Washington, Marano testified before congressional committees and formed legislative proposals about job training, vocational education and welfare-to-work. At Wider Opportunities for Women she developed outreach for women to become involved in the construction trade and other jobs not often filled by women. She also worked to create women's literacy programs. Her work contributed to four federal laws, including the Nontraditional Employment for Women Act of 1992, which provided women access to training for related jobs. She also helped to develop the Family Economic Self-Sufficiency which is used by some U.S. states to determine living wages for families based on age and number of children and geographical location.

Starting in 1988 she began advocating for affordable child care for working mothers, stating that educations, employers and politicians were "failing miserably at providing women a way out of poverty." Marano also examined women's roles in media. In 1990 she spoke out against the lack of roles for women in television, showing concern about the consequences of young women not seeing themselves represented appropriately in programming. She left Washington in 1997 for California and started her own business, Marano and Associates, which developed strategies for helping low-income people move out of poverty.

In 2001, she joined the National Economic Development and Law Center in Oakland. She would eventually serve as director of its National Network of Sector Partners project, which sought to improve economic development and employment opportunities for low-income people, families and communities.

Marano founded the Washington-based Women Work! The National Network for Displaced Homemakers and the Older Women's League, the National Coalition on Women, Work and Welfare Reform, and the National Women's Vote Project. She served as vice chairwoman of Equal Rights Advocates and the National Committee for Responsive Philanthropy. Marano also served on advisory commissions for three U.s. secretaries of labor and the Private Industry Council. She was awarded the Ms. Foundation for Women's Gloria Award for Women of Vision and the National Award for Women's Economic Justice. Marano also provided support to her community in Oakland, working with the Reconciling Program for the LGBT community at Lake Merritt Unified Methodist Church. She was a vocal activist within the Methodist Church about same-sex marriage.

== Legacy ==
After her death in April 2005, a public memorial service was held in Oakland at Lake Merritt Unified Methodist Church. The Cindy Marano Memorial Fund was founded to support strategic and immediate actions and policies that can impact the lives of low-income people, specifically women. In 2005 the Sector Skills Academy, a program of the Aspen Institute, named their inaugural Academy class "Marano Fellows" as a tribute to Marano.
