= Michael J. Snarskis =

American archeologist

- Born: 12 April 1945; Davenport, Iowa, United States
- Died: 24 January 2011 (aged 65); Montelimar, Goicoechea, Costa Rica
- Citizenship: American
- Education: State University of Iowa; Yale University; Columbia University
- Known for: Numerous archeological discoveries in Costa Rica
- Spouse: Jennifer Walter

Michael Jay Snarskis (April 12, 1945 – January 24, 2011) was an American archeologist who founded the scientific study of archaeology in Costa Rica. At that time, almost all artifacts available to collectors were shorn of their provenance and historical significance by huaquero looters, whom Snarskis described as "the tomb-robbers ... who have [made] such studies more difficult."

== Early life and education ==
Michael Snarskis was born in Davenport, Iowa, on April 12, 1945, the son of Edward and Alice Cressey Snarskis. He attended Washington Senior High School in Cedar Rapids, then State University of Iowa (1963–1964) and Yale University (1964–1967), majoring in Spanish. After one year of law school, Snarskis joined the Peace Corps, serving in Costa Rica. His interest in archeology awakened in Costa Rica, and on his return he studied archeology at Columbia University. After three years of field work in Costa Rica, he received his Ph.D. in 1978 with a dissertation on The Archaeology of the Central Atlantic Watershed of Costa Rica.

== Career ==
When Snarskis received his Ph.D. in 1978, there was almost no scientific archeology in Costa Rica. Snarskis founded the Archeology Department at the Museo Nacional de Costa Rica in San José, Costa Rica, and directed it for 10 years, hiring the first Costa Rican archeology students to work there. He became a professor of archaeology at the Universidad de Costa Rica, remaining there for 14 years. As an archeologist and conservationist, Snarskis worked for the Tayutic Foundation, which seeks to preserve and explore the Guayabo National Monument. The Jade Museum and the Gold Museum, both in San José, Costa Rica, had Snarskis as their technical advisor.

Snarskis founded and edited VÍNCULOS: Revisita de Antropologia del Museo Nacional de Costa Rica, a professional journal that won awards for scientific excellence and which continues to be published today, one of the longest runs for a scientific journal in Latin America.

From 1986 to 1997 Snarskis took on an international mission job as chief editor and head of publications for the Inter-American Institute for Cooperation on Agriculture (IICA).

Michael Snarskis died quietly, apparently while reading a book, at his home in Costa Rica on January 24, 2011.

== Contributions to Pre-Columbian archaeology ==
Highlights of excavation projects directed by Snarskis include

- Discovery of the first Paleoindian quarry and workshop site some 12,000 years old, first of its kind known, and with both Clovis and fishtail fluted spear points, diagnostic of Paleoindian hunters in North and South America respectively.
- The oldest known pottery in the country, two very different complexes from around 2000 BC
- The first clear house foundations found in the lowland Caribbean rain forest, from about the first century AD.
- An extraordinary 33 cm Olmec jade clamshell pendant, found just 15 minutes away from the National Museum in a San José suburb, one of the best Olmec jades known, and evidence of ancient long-distance trade with Mesoamerica.
- Several effigy vessels of Usulatan pottery made in El Salvador, along with many other local high status ceramics and 65 jade pendants in a burial ground on a high terrace overlooking the Pacific

Snarskis’s work identified evidence of interaction between northern Mesoamerican and southern South American cultural influences in Costa Rica. This overlap has been used to examine patterns of cultural exchange and diffusion in the region.

== Publications ==
- The Art of Precolumbian Gold: The Jan Mitchell Collection. New York: The Metropolitan Museum of Art. 1985. ISBN 9780297786276.
- La Ceramica Precolombina en Costa Rica = [Pre-Columbian Ceramics in Costa Rica] by Michael J. Snarskis 1982
- "Central America: the Lower Caribbean", in The Archaeology of Lower Central America, Lange, F. W. and Stone, D. Z., Eds., University of New Mexico Press, Albuquerque, 1984.
- The Archaeology of Costa Rica". In Between Continents/Between Seas: Precolumbian Art of Costa Rica, pp. 15–84. Harry N. Abrams, Inc. New York, 1981
- The Archaeology of Costa Rica, ArqueoCostaRica, the online journal of Costa Rican Archaeology
- Costa Rica 10,000 Years Ago: Evidence of the Earliest Known Peoples, by Michael J. Snarskis, ArqueoCostaRica.net Website
- The First Farmers in Costa Rica: Tropical Archaic Period in Lower Central America, by Michael J. Snarskis
- Costa Rica's First Potters: The Earliest Known Archaeological Ceramics, by Michael J. Snarskis
- The Rise of Chiefdoms: A Surge in Population and Complexity in Pre-Columbian Costa Rica, by Michael J. Snarskis
- The Rise of Chiefdoms, Part II: Symbols of Power, Status and Wealth in Pre-Columbian Costa Rica, by Michael J. Snarskis
- Archaeologists and Huaqueros, by Michael J. Snarskis
- "Turrialba: A Paleo-Indian Quarry and Workshop Site in Eastern Costa Rica" in American Antiquity, Vol. 44, No. 1, 1979, by Michael J. Snarskis
- "From Jade to Gold in Costa Rica: How, Why, and When", by Michael J. Snarskis. In Gold and Power in Ancient Costa Rica, Panama, and Colombia, Jeffrey Quilter and John W. Hoopes, Editors

== See also ==
- List of museums in Costa Rica
- Costa Rica: Pre-Columbian Period
- Isthmo-Colombian
- Guayabo de Turrialba
- Stone spheres of Costa Rica
- Grave robbery
- Metate
