= Sapreet Kaur =

American activist (born 1976)

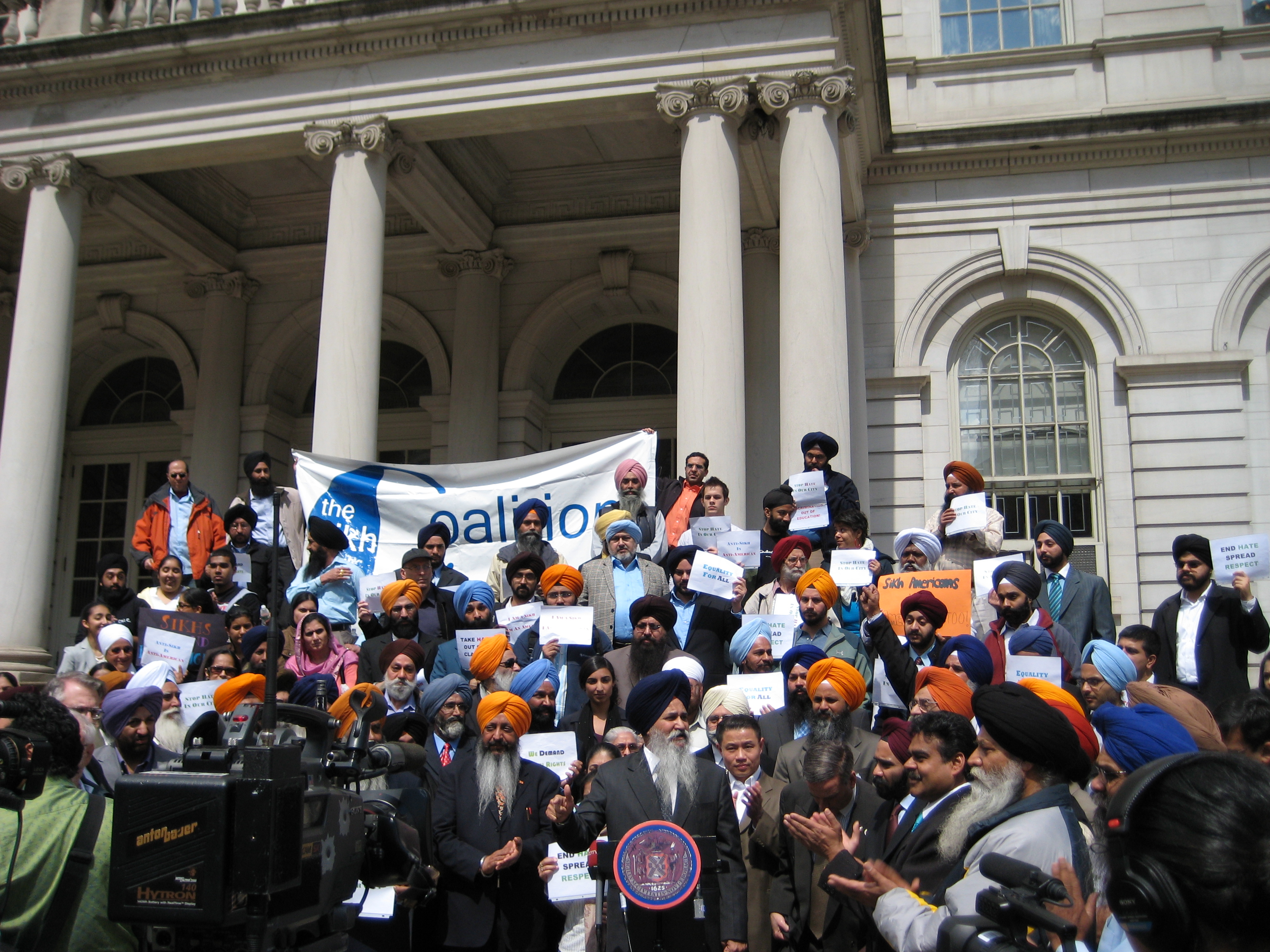
Members of the Sikh Coalition (2008)

Sapreet Kaur Saluja, usually known as Sapreet Kaur, (born on May 7, 1976) is an American civil rights activist who served as the executive director of the Sikh Coalition in the United States from 2009 to 2017. In January 2013, she became the first Sikh to speak at a Presidential Inaugural Prayer Service in Washington D.C.

== Biography ==
Saluja was born and raised in central New Jersey where her parents had arrived from Punjab in the 1960s. She went to the Sikh-oriented Khalsa School in Bridgewater, New Jersey, regularly attending Camp Chardi Kala in the summer months. In 1998, she graduated in marketing and international business at New York University's Stern School of Business.

After graduating, Kaur served as a volunteer in the United States Peace Corps in Kenya and Uganda (1998–2001), creating local programs in the areas of conservation, conflict resolution and organizational development. Thereafter she worked in management positions at Coach, Inc. and at Teach for America where she developed human capital leadership strategies for work aimed at overcoming inequity in education.

In 2007, Kaur became a member of the board of directors of the Sikh Coalition where she was appointed executive director in 2009. Since 2014, she has served as international commissioner for the National Board of Directors. On her appointment as executive director, Kaur became the first woman to have led a Sikh civil rights organization in the United States. In her own words, her goal has been to bring the full force of all our program areas, partner organizations and volunteers across the country to defend the rights of Sikhs to fearlessly practice our faith".

Kaur is serving as a board member of the World Association of Girl Guides and Girl Scouts (2008–2014) and is a member of the Desmond Tutu Peace Foundation board of directors.

Sapreet Kaur has a son, Zorawar Singh (born 2010).
