= Olga Fierz =

Swiss teacher and translator (1900–1990)

Olga Fierz (26 July 1900 – 17 June 1990) was a Swiss teacher and translator. After 1926 she teamed up with Přemysl Pitter to undertake welfare work for disadvantaged children in Prague. In 1933 they opened their “Milíč House”, a flexibly oriented part-residential children's home with playrooms, clubrooms, together with library and gymnastics hall, a workshop and outdoor sports facilities. There were also educators on hand to help children with school work issues. After 1938 the focus changed. The “Milíč House” attracted suspicion from the security services: it became unacceptably dangerous to accommodate orphaned Jewish children in it. Fierz was nevertheless able to concentrate on arranging deliveries of food and other basic essentials to the hiding places in the city of Jewish children suffering persecution and, increasingly, to Jewish orphans. After 1945 Pitter and Fierz were able to take over four abandoned chateaux in the countryside south of Prague and convert these into temporary orphanages. In addition to Jewish children, the slaughter of war and the Soviet mandated ethnic cleansing of the middle 1940s meant there were large numbers of abandoned and destitute children of German ethnicity to be cared for, and the two groups, hitherto racially segregated by the authorities (and frequently in the eyes of society more generally), were treated as one. However, a new form of externally imposed one-party dictatorship was taking hold in Czechoslovakia, and in December 1950 Fierz was refused re-admission to the country when returning from her sister's funeral, which she had attended in Switzerland. The next year Přemysl Pitter was also expelled, and for ten years their welfare work was concentrated on a refugee camp near Nuremberg (Franconia) in the part of Germany that had been relaunched, in 1949, as the U.S.-sponsored German Federal Republic (West Germany). Here the focus was again on children, caught up in the refugee tide created by the imposition of Soviet one-party rule over much of Eastern and central Europe.

Olga Fierz received various marks of official recognition during her life-time, and the accumulation of awards continued after she died. In 1966, acting on behalf of the State of Israel, Yad Vashem, honoured her as a Righteous Among the Nations. On 21 May 1985 a tree was planted in her honour along the Avenue of the Righteous Among the Nations at the Holocaust Memorial Centre in Jerusalem. Some years after she died in 1990 a recently discovered “Main-belt Asteroid” (SPKID: 2048782) was named in her honour.

== Life ==
=== Provenance and early years ===
Olga Fierz was born into a Protestant family in Baden (Aargau), a small town with a mixed economy in the hill country west of Zürich. This is where, in conditions of reasonable prosperity, she spent her early childhood till 1910. That year the manufacturing business her father had acquired was bankrupted. Fierz later wrote that her father, while an excellent technician, was never able to adapt to the pragmatic requirements needed to run a business. For the rest of her childhood, family finances were precarious and relations between her father and her mother were strained. The Fierz family relocated in 1911 to Brussels where her father had accepted work with a Swiss-owned company, and where he remained for six years. Olga stayed on in Brussels with her mother and sister for longer, obtaining by 1918 a higher-level teaching qualification from the teachers’ training seminary incorporated into the city's oldest secondary school for girls, the “Ecole normale Emile André”. She was able to return to Switzerland in 1918 following the conclusion of the war. She returned with her sister and mother to live with her father who had returned in search of a job in 1916 and settled in Zug. It turned out, however, that Olga's wartime Belgian teaching qualification enjoyed no formal recognition in Switzerland.

=== Geneva ===
Fierz had become a huge admirer of the Swiss educationist Johann Heinrich Pestalozzi, whose pioneering reforms had acquired widespread backing among progressive teaching circles in Europe, especially in the German speaking countries. During or before 1920 she enrolled at the innovative “Académie De Genève or Institut Jean-Jacques Rousseau” / “Pädagogische Institut Jean-Jacques Rousseau” in Geneva on a “Gasthörerin” basis. (Note: It had become not uncommon for the more progressive university-level educational institutions in Switzerland and Germany to permit females to attend lectures and courses as “guest students”, which meant that women could benefit from the educational opportunities available even if, at this stage, they were in most cases, not permitted to receive university degrees.) The education psychologist Jean Piaget had recently joined the staff as a director of studies in psychology, despite being only four tears older than Fierz. At this stage he had not yet undertaken and published the pedagogical research with which he has subsequently become associated, however.

=== Great Missenden ===
Keen to avoid being a financial burden on her parents for any longer, during her time in Geneva Fierz tried to work her way through her studies by applying for and accepting a post she found advertised in a newspaper to work as a live-in nanny-tutor with a family in the city who had two school-age children. After a year, however, she concluded that it was impossible to combine a career as a fulltime nanny-tutor with fulltime study at the institute. It was based on recommendations from the Rousseau Pedagogical Institute that during 1921 she therefore relocated to England, where for the next five years she was employed as a teacher of French at the “Garden School”, a boarding school for girls at Ballinger (Great Missenden), then about an hour by train from London. She was given a class of forty girls to teach, ranging in age from 5 to 17. It was a condition of her employment that she should speak only in French. She employed various devices including games, dances, songs and dialogues, resorting to tales from the French classics when she found herself running short of ideas. Her teaching methods were popular with her pupils, especially the older ones, while her obviously deep innate affection for children also ensured that she was a great success as a teacher in England. While Olga was working as a teacher in England, her younger sister Claire dropped out of a course at the Music Conservatory in Zug and Olga was able to secure her a position at the English school as an “au pair”, accepted by the head mistress so as to be able to help the children improve their conversational French. During the middle 1920s things turned sour at the school for Olga. She was deeply religious and had become increasingly politicised through her childhood experiences and through some of the friends she acquired beyond the school gates. She became concerned that she was devoting her teaching skills exclusively to children from the middle and upper classes: she developeda gnawing concern that she should, perhaps, find a way to help children from less privileged backgrounds as well. During the build up to the General Strike in England she found herself unable to stay silent one lunch-time when the head teacher, whom she was sitting next to, launched herself into a bitter attack against the irresponsible position taken by striking print workers who were refusing to print political material with which they disagreed. As the woman complained that the workers were failing to attend to their duties, Olga Fierz asserted that if she were to find herself called upon to teach the children something with which she disagreed, she too would go on strike. The head teacher became very angry, and noisily condemned Fierz in front of fellow staff members and children. The time had come to move on. During 1926 she resigned her position.

=== Politicisation and the Christian Peace Movement ===
Olga Fierz's five years in England turned out to be a time of self-discovery. The English boarding school provided hands-on access to Montessorian precepts which would guide her approach to child development throughout her life. She converted to vegetarianism, believing that this was good for problems with her hair and, more importantly, would help develop the refinement and sensitivity of her mental development, opening the way for ethical criteria to direct her decisions. She became actively involved in a number of international societies and organisations that had emerged during the aftermath of the First World War in order to ensure that nothing like it should ever happen again. These included the International Fellowship of Reconciliation (IFOR), the Fellowship of Reconciliation and ”Již nikdy válku!”. It was while participating in a “workcamp” organised by this last grouping near Paris that she came across the ideas of Pierre Cérésole. She also became associated with the circle of Christian pacifists around Leonhard Ragaz. In 1924 or 1925 she took part in a “workcamp” in England at which, for the first time since the war, German delegates were to be invited. Many of the participants were relatively young, and representative of a generation among which German teaching had not been available in British schools and English teaching had not been accessible in German schools. As an experienced languages teacher from Switzerland, a country with an established polyglot tradition and a reputation, in recent centuries, for political neutrality, Fierz was much in demand at the workcamp as a translator between pacifist activists of different nations. The rare extent of her mastery of several mainstream European languages quickly became widely known, and freelance translation would in future provide a useful supplementary income stream when the necessity arose.

=== Přemysl Pitter ===
In the early summer of 1926 Fierz was persuaded the interrupt the job searching in which she was engaged at the time in order to attend an IFOR “Summer Peace School-Conference” at Oberammergau, where, following a by now familiar pattern, she found herself much in demand as a simultaneous translator. The main conference lasted three days, but was followed by a three-week training session for IFOR leaders in which it appears she also participated as a translator. The “White Horse Inn” in which she was accommodated was set aside for vegetarian delegates of whom there were many. Sitting down for the first evening meal she found herself sitting opposite a man whom she remembered from a pacifist conference she had attended a year earlier. He was memorable because she recalled that he had talked at length about the way in which wider adoption of Esperanto would soon remove the international language difficulties with which the world struggled. They quickly found that pacifism was not the only topic on which they agreed. There was, most importantly, a meeting of minds on the important subject of God. Přemysl Pitter already had his life plan mapped out before him, and according to his own later recollection he shared it with his dinner companion at the Oberammergau hotel: “I have accepted that my life does not belong to me …. I would never marry and start a family, but must work in the place that God has appointed for me …. bringing up children according to the Gospel”. (Note: “Uvědomil jsem si, řekl jí, že můj život nepatří mně, a rozhodl se, že se nikdy neožením a nezaložím rodinu, ale že budu pracovat na tom místě, které mi Bůh určil - a to je výchova dětí podle evangelia”.) Commentators assert that Pitter's vision was not instantly compatible with 26 year old Olga Fierz's own life plans, but any doubts she may have entertained were swept away. On a traditional reading, Fierz and Pitter fell in love almost at once. During the three weeks that remained to them in Oberammergau Pitter introduced her to his pacifist friends, such as the Anglo-Irish Quaker Lilian Stevenson, the Russian writer Valentin Bulgakov and his erudite friend from Prague, the writer-translator Pavla Moudrá. Notwithstanding the absence of a conventional marriage between them, during the next couple of years they teamed up, after which they presented to the world a formidably effective partnership in respect of their shared vision of God's will until Pitter's death in 1976.

During the first part of 1927 Pitter's urgings that Fierz should visit him in Prague intensified. She arrived on 15 April which that year coincided with Good Friday, and was introduced to Pitter's friends in the city and their shared ambition to create a home for the city's destitute children in Prague- Žižkov. Pitter had been openly dismissive when asked how the necessary funding should be obtained and it is not clear how far advanced the project had advanced in practical terms, but its name had already been chosen: it was to be called the Milíč-House to celebrate a respect fourteenth century preacher seem by admirers as a prophet of the Protestant reformation on account of his uncompromising calls for moral renewal. Fierz hesitated while Pitter continued to press her to join him in his dream. During 1927 they were sometimes together and sometimes apart, but in 1928 or 1929 (sources differ) she returned to Prague, taking a permanent teaching position in the city and thereby confirming she was back for the long term. The determination with which she set about mastering the unfamiliar intricacies of the Czechoslovak language, a newly derived concatenation of two closely related West Slavic languages, confirmed her commitment to making Prague her new home. Increasingly, the focus of her life became the Milíč-House project. Prague remained a multi-ethnic city at this stage, and through a combination of her well-honed language teaching skills and her mother-tongue level German, Fierz found it easy to obtain work as a languages teacher when funds ran short. Friends who joined them in the project included a well-regarded young functionalist architect called Erwin Katona who by 1933 had drawn up the necessary plans. Funding to the tune of approximately half a million Krone remained a challenge however. Pitter was confident that the Lord would provide when He was read, and early in 1933 the Fierz gave him a nudge, drawing Pitter's attention to an article she had read about a property developer and builder called Karel Skorkovský who had recently built several residential homes for unemployed workers. It turned out that Skorkovský was a committed member of the Evangelical Church. Skorkovský agreed to construct the Milíč-House in two stages, starting with the ground floor and completing the upper storeys a little later. As regards the funding short-fall, he would himself provide sufficient credit to cover the deficit, confident that he would be repaid as further funds became available. As matters turned out, the money would be fully paid back by the end of 1941. Meanwhile, on 24 December 1933 Milíč-House opened, at this stage in a single-storey building as a multi-faceted support facility for destitute children and their families. A second floor was added in 1936.

=== Prague and the Milíč-House ===
As soon as the Milíč-House opened, Fierz was able to out her prodigious teaching and organisational skills to good use. She produced a series of practical manuals on children's education through drama. There were other manuals on children's work and children's entertainment. She saw to it that systems were in place and that everything of significance that happened was documented. As her fluency improved she also contributed extensively to the house-magazine, addressing many of the same themes as those covered in the manuals. Facilities were expanded year by year, but attention was also paid to basic needs. Education was one priority, but the physical well-being of children was also prioritized. They were bathed regularly and subjected to medical supervision. They received snacks supplemented, during the appropriate seasons, with fresh vegetables from the garden. (Naturally the available diet was exclusively vegetarian.) As far as possible, the distribution of food and clothing was concentrated on children from the most needy families. In 1938 a separate sanatorium building, apparently for the separation and treatment of children suffering from Tuberculosis was added, supplemented during summer months by a tented camp.

=== Prague under Hitlerite occupation ===
During March 1938 Germany launched a step by step annexation of Czechoslovakia which in terms of territorial possession had been completed by the end of 1939. Olga Fierz had never had reason to renounce her Swiss passport: she was now politely but firmly invited by the embassy in Prague to leave Czechoslovakia at once and return home to Switzerland. Given the tense political situation in Czechoslovakia the Swiss diplomatic service was no longer able to provide any assurances s to her safety if she remained in Prague. Fierz refused to leave her friends and her job, however. She reasoned – possibly correctly – that under German occupation her passport might afford her a measure of freedom not available to fellow workers who were Czechoslovak nationals, which could be of use in her work for the Milíč-House. The facility remained open, but was now required by the authorities to identify any Jewish children and to exclude these.

Prague had been exceptionally ethnically diverse for generations, and it had been a favoured place of exile for German political exiles since 1933. For these and other reasons, the population was closely monitored during the German occupation. Openly flouting the authorities’ insistence on their bizarre anti-human race dogmas would quickly have become, at best, counter-productive, but it has become apparent that, especially during the late evenings, there was much that Olga Fierz and drawing Přemysl Pitter to endure that Jewish children concealed in the city were supported and, most importantly, fed along with other children made destitute by the traumas of the times.

=== “Aktion Schlösser” / “Akce Zámky” ===
The liberation of Prague took place only in May 1945. The child welfare crisis rapidly became very much more acute than ever. There were, in particular, a huge number of orphans, principally identified as ethnically Jewish or ethnically German. Many, especially of the Jewish children, were concentration camp survivors badly traumatised by experiences that included the deaths of parents and/or siblings. Many of the German children, despite coming from families that had lived in Prague for generations, had experienced the post-war ethnically targeted rage of ethnic Czechoslovaks who had survived seven years of often brutal German military occupation. The years 1945-47 were a period of industrial scale ethnic cleansing, responding both to the demands of those who had fought in wartime antiNazi resistance and the strategic objectives of Moscow. In the more immediate terms, hundreds were detained at Theresienstadt and in other repurposed Hitler-era concentration camps which again became badly over-crowded and insanitary. Children at Theresienstadt were in particular danger since the camp had been hit by an intense typhoid epidemic. The sheer scale of the problem left the Milíč-House looking hopelessly over-whelmed. Fierz and Pitter could see that they were not entirely powerless to help, however. They were part of a wider Christian community. Between them, they had contacts. And at Milíč-House they already had a team of fellow workers committed to and experienced in providing practical support to children from “difficult” backgrounds. During the summer of 1945 Pitter and Fierz persuaded the “revolutionary council” to give them the use of four castle-manor houses in the countryside to the south of the city which had been used as concentration camps till 1945. These had been confiscated or had previously belonged to people who had disappeared – presumed killed – during the war. To avoid any future difficulties over ownership, the revolutionary council declared them to be state property. They were at Štiřín, Olešovice, Kamenice and Lojovice. Later in 1945 a fifth premises, a large repurposed guest house at Ládví was added to the “property portfolio”. Due to the epidemics rife in the concentration camps by the time the war ended, they had something of the nature of sanitoria, especially during the early months. The construction of medical facilities was a priority. Pitter himself visited Dr. Emil Vogl, a physician who was at the time recovering from typhus in a sanatorium, and pleaded with the doctor to come and construct a medical facility for the home at Olešovice. Vogl did so and, it is reported despite being the only survivor from a family which before 1938 had numbered 36, saw to it that Jewish and German children were treated without reference to ethnicity. Vogl was also one of those who was generous with financial support. Pitter took over management on behalf of the Ministry of health on condition that the facilities be used to accommodate and look after Czechoslovak children who had survived and emerged from the concentration camps. Fierz was at his side, facing the massive organisational task arising. There was no shortage of volunteers, both from among their existing network and from the wider community. Many arrived with valuable teaching or medical expertise. Among the better known of those who had not previously been part of the Milíč-House community was the writer-scholar Hans Günther Adler. The co-ordination challenges were considerable. Many of the fittings and furnishings were transferred from former barracks and Hitler Youth facilities in Prague that had been used during the German occupation. Existing staff and neighbours at the facilities were carefully cultivated in order to try and minimise the risk of looting by Soviet soldiers which had become a major problem in post-war Czechoslovakia. No attempt was ever made to restrict admission to “Czechoslovak children” as the authorities had mandated, nor indeed to classify the children systematically according to race. Financing was undertaken on the same basis as that of the Milíč House, and it was from the Milíč House that the overall operation continued to be directed and administered. There were several helpfully generous legacies and a plethora of other donations. Over the next couple of years the “castles” became pedagogical rehabilitation orphanages. The operation came to be known as “Aktion Schlösser” / “Akce Zámky”. Alongside restoring the children to physical health and attending to their educational needs, a lot of one-on-one counselling was necessary. Many of the children had unimaginable experiences to offload. The subject of death was frequently raised. Another recurring theme among some of the older Jewish children who had survived German concentration camps was a horror that someone might be about to try and “convert” them to Christianity, a fear which Pitter and Fierz did everything possible to correct. Over the course of two years more than 800 children passed through the “Aktion Schlösser” homes in the countryside south of Prague. As they recovered, efforts were devoted to finding more permanent arrangements for them. Sometimes it was possible to relocate them with family members. Others were sent in to foster care. In view of the ethnic cleansing of the time, there was seen to be no future for those identified as of German ethnicity in the new Czechoslovakia, while there was a general assumption that Jewish children, having suffered as they had in occupied Czechoslovakia, should not wish to remain in the country for the long terms. By the end of 1947 most of the children had been settled in Palestine – still, at that stage, administered as a semi-detached part of the British empire – or in what remained of Germany. According to at least one source, at the end of 1947 “Aktion Schlösser” / “Akce Zámky” was banned by the authorities, but sources are not entirely consistent as to timelines. Elsewhere it is stated that work to try and locate relatives for remaining lost children was still underway at Milíč House as late as 1950.

Between 1945 and 1950, while Fierz and Pitter concentrated on trying to redress to impact of the German occupation on the children in their care, Czechoslovakia faced continuing struggle, both among the politicians and, increasingly, on the streets. There had been a somewhat vaguely communicated acceptance among the leaders of the United States, the Soviet Union, Britain and France that after 1945 the country should be within the Soviet sphere of influence, but among the western leaders there had been little consensus expressed as to what that might involve. In February 1948 a coup d'état staged by and on behalf of Czechoslovakia's Soviet-backed Communist Party presented some answers. Soon afterwards the political trials began. Schools and “social institutions” were all nationalised. The future was to involve one-party post-democratic government imposed, where necessary, by force. The ruling ideology was to be a Leninist version of socialism mistrustful of free expression or non-standard thought. The Milíč House operated as a children's shelter under conditions of growing government-backed interference through 1948 until it was forcibly closed down by the government, probably in December 1949: the facilities continued to be used for forms of youth work more closely aligned with party priorities, while Dierz and Pitter found their roles progressively redefined and a portrait of Stalin was solemnly placed on the wall of the main hall. In February 1950 Claire Fierz, Olga's younger sister, died. Olga went to Switzerland to attend the funeral. When she set about returning to Prague she was refused an entry visa by the Czechoslovak authorities. She therefore remained in Switzerland, separated from Pitter for well over a year. In Prague Pitter was now formally relived of all duties in connection with The Milíč House and forbidden to set foot in the place. He was subject to increasing harassment from the security services and threatened with arrest. In September 1951 Fierz, working from Switzerland with friends in Czechoslovakia and in East Germany, was able to participate in the arrangements for him to be smuggled across the border into the German Democratic Republic and from there to West Berlin. (The border between East and West Berlin, which a few years later became for most purposes impassable, was in 1951 still completely porous.) He submitted an application for political asylum in West Germany and another for a travel visa to London where he had been given to understand that he was likely to be offered a job with the BBC. He also underwent at least three in-depth interviews with representatives of U.S. intelligence who listened intently and took careful notes as he answered their questions on the state of culture and the arts in Czechoslovakia. After several changes of career plan he was able to take a flight to Munich where on 23 October 1951 he was reunited with Olga. They were still in Munich when news came through that the West German authorities had agreed his asylum application. Olga did not accompany him to London, however, where he spent several months during the first part of 1952 and determined that his broadcasting career in London was very much less full-time than he had assumed.

=== Valka Camp ===
The 1948 Communist take-over in Czechoslovakia was not an isolated case. A series of Soviet-backed government takeovers in several countries of central Europe, together with other enforced population shifts, triggered a sustained flood of refugees from the east till approximately 1950. Millions ended up, at least in the first instance in refugee camps in occupied Austria or in the western occupation zones (rebranded in May 1949 as the German Federal Republic). Both Olga Fierz and Přemysl Pitter were victims of expulsion from the eastern side of the “Iron Curtain”. They were well aware of the welfare issues arising in the refugee camps. The camps became the responsibility of the International Refugee Organization in 1948 but inmates still enjoyed no significant rights under international law and refugees issues remained badly under-resourced. The camps were located in countries where governments were still struggling to clear the rubble from the city streets and to ensure that their own populations were fed. During 1952 Pitter and Fierz together toured the principal refugee camps in Austria and West Germany in order to identify the welfare needs of inmates. Due to the large number of beneficiaries of as “Aktion Schlösser” / “Akce Zámky” who were by now building new lives in the newly launched State of Israel they had already received several invitations to travel to that country and engage in welfare work, but they believed that their first duty lay closer to home in the refugee camps of (western) central Europe, where at this stage they had no significant public profile. Having undertaken their work between 1938 and 1950 in Prague they were viewed as foreigners, and local authorities resisted “foreign interference” in the operation and management of the camps. Foreigners, in West Germany, were not permitted to undertake work in case it reduced the employment opportunities for German people. Eventually, however, Fierz and Pitter were able to obtain testimonials from the German Red Cross with which they had worked closely from Prague while trying to find surviving relatives or acceptable long-term foster arrangements for children of German ethnicity who had ended up in their care.

After the International Refugee Organization (IRO) took on responsibility for the refugee camps 1948 there was no immediate slowing down in the number of refugees arriving from the east. Unable to manage all the camps with its own personnel on account of the scale of the task, the IRO began to delegate management of camps to locally based teams. In West Germany the first of the camps to be handed over to be operated by West Germans was among the largest and most challenging was the Valka Camp for Displaced Persons, a former prisoner of war camp at Nuremberg-Langwasser which had been taken over by the so-called United Nations Relief and Rehabilitation Administration. It was here that Přemysl Pitter and Olga Fierz worked for ten years between 1952 and 1962 on behalf, formally, of the World Council of Churches. A wide range of nationalities were represented among the refugees, but the largest group, by nationality, were believed to have come from Czechoslovakia, so the city folk of Nuremberg took to referring to it as the “Tschechenlager”. When Pitter and Fierz arrived there were approximately 4,000 people. Interspersed with the conventional refugees fleeing from communism and war, was the normal quota of “ex-criminals awaiting denazification”. The physical conditions recalled the camp's use till 1945 as an overcrowded prisoner of war camp. The majority of the refugees were young men. The women and children aged under 14, who were always the focus of the spiritual and practical welfare work undertaken by Pitter and Fierz, represented a (sometimes vulnerable) minority. In terms of declared nationality there were 800 Czechs, 700 each from Poland and Ukraine, 550 Dlovaks, 320 Yugoslavs, 300 Hungarians, 200 Russians and 140 from the Baltic states. Of the various camps they had seen, Pitter would later recall that Valka was the “most depressing” in terms of the situation they found there when they arrived: “Although people can move freely in the camp, it feels like one big prison because so many of the inmates have absolutely nowhere else to go. ….. The situation of the young people is worst: They quickly fall prey to alcoholism, prostitution, theft and fraud”. He later recalled the way in which the duration of the enforced stay to which inmates were subjected created a mood of bitterness and mistrust which was then contagious to new arrivals. Despite the fact that people can move freely in the camp, we had the impression that Valka is one big prison, because so many of its inhabitants have absolutely no way to go anywhere else. For many it is worse than prison. The situation of young people is the worst. They quickly fall into alcoholism, prostitution, theft and fraud.” Elsewhere, Pitter wrote: The long and forced stay in the camp caused bitterness and resentment in many. Their mistrust was contagious to the newcomers. According to the way they were treated in the camp and the way they were served food, the refugees could rightly believe that they had made a mistake in the direction of escape. The winter coal ration was inadequate and the electricity supply frequently cut out. Although he engaged in “social work” the focus of Pitter's work at the Valka Camp was on preaching. Fierz was not blind to the spiritual needs of refugees, but much of her time was also devoted to helping people with little or no understanding of German to communicate with officialdom locally. She became adept at writing asylum application letters not just in German but in a range of other western European languages. She worked to sort out family and financial problems. There are indications that no two days were alike, and more detailed records of her work during her ten years at Valka are not available. By the time the camp could finally be closed, in 1962, she was suffering from a high fever symptomatic, according to Pitter in a memoire, of her complete physical and mental exhaustion.

=== Later years ===
The political situation there meant that a return to Czechoslovakia was still not possible. Instead the couple moved to the country of Olga's birth and early childhood where they made their home together in a small rented apartment at Affoltern am Albis, a small town in the hills south of Zürich. Pitter was penniless, but from somewhere Fierz had enough income to support them both at the outset. The move was facilitated by a former attaché at the Swiss embassy in Prague called F.Glasser who knew them already at took time to write articles about them in the local newspapers, ensuring that the welcome they received from the townsfolk of Affoltern was friendly. They were also helped by Lotar Neumann (1918-1992), a Czech-born factory owner who had become a successful businessman in Venezuela. Neumann's father had been a friend and generous donor towards the Milíč-House project in the 1930s and early 1940s, but had perished during the war in a concentration camp. Lothar Neumann was still appreciative of support he and his father had received during the bad times in Prague, and had recently returned to Europe, settling in Geneva. Neumann now provided Pitter with a monthly annuity worth 800 francs till Pitter's death. Once again, the Lord had provided. During their semi-retirement Olga Fierz established the “Swiss Jan Hus Congregation for Czechs and Slovaks” (‘’”Johannes-Hus--Gemeinde der Tschechen und Slowaken”’’) and launched at least one small-scale specialist teaching project. She participated in the work of the “Czechoslovak Society for Arts and Culture in Switzerland” and other organisations supportive of exiled Czechoslovaks. She also participated in the production of “Hovory s pisateli”, a Czech-language bi8-monthly publication for the exiles which, while he lived, was written by Pitter. After he died in 1976 Fierz continued to produce it, but it no longer appeared either so regularly or so frequently, and it comprised almost exclusively extracted from the literary estate of Přemysla Pitter. She also arranged for the publication of many of his sermons.
