= VolTra =

Non-governmental organisation in Hong Kong

- Native name: 義遊
- Company type: NGO
- Industry: Social services
- Founded: April 16, 2009
- Headquarters: Kowloon, Hong Kong
- Services: International Volunteer Service
- Website: www.voltra.org

VolTra (traditional Chinese: 義遊; simplified Chinese: 义游) is a Hong Kong non-governmental organisation. Registered as a charitable institution in Hong Kong, VolTra promotes international voluntary services in Hong Kong through a network of international workcamp organisations. VolTra is an official member of CCIVS, which stands for Co-ordinating Committee for International Voluntary Service.

== History ==
VolTra was founded in June 2009 by eight Hong Kong people. One of the founders was Bird Tang Wai Wing (Chinese: 鄧緯榮), a biology teacher at Caritas Chan Chun Ha Field Studies Centre in Cheung Chau. Through an introduction by a friend, Bird joined his first workcamp in 2008 in Mongolia. He taught English to local children and herded livestock on the grasslands with them. Hong Kong did not have an international workcamp group then although Japan and Taiwan had already launched such groups. Inspired by his friends, Bird established VolTra and continued working as a teacher as he managed VolTra. He quit his job as a teacher to become VolTra's executive director in 2014. VolTra allows time-pressed travellers to partake in workcamps to assist foreign populaces through initiatives that impact environmental protection and agriculture. Through VolTra's collaboration with the Network for Voluntary Development in Asia (NVDA), a coalition of 22 non-governmental organisations, VolTra provided access to over 3,000 workcamps in 2009. Workcamp sessions typically range from 10 to 14 days but can reach one to three months or be as short as four to five days. Five years after its founding, the organisation had enlisted over 1,000 people to participate in workcamps.

== Operations ==
VolTra together with other international workcamp organisations all over the world provide over 3,000 international workcamps and voluntary service projects every year in more than 100 countries. At the same time, VolTra also organises international workcamps in Hong Kong for both local and overseas volunteers to participate in the voluntary services and cultural exchange activities in Hong Kong.
