= Shannon O'Donnell =

Shannon O'Donnell may refer to:

- Shannon O'Donnell (meteorologist) (born 1973), American meteorologist and news anchor
- Shannon O'Donnell (writer), American travel writer
