= European Solidarity Corps =

Voluntary service financed by the EU commission

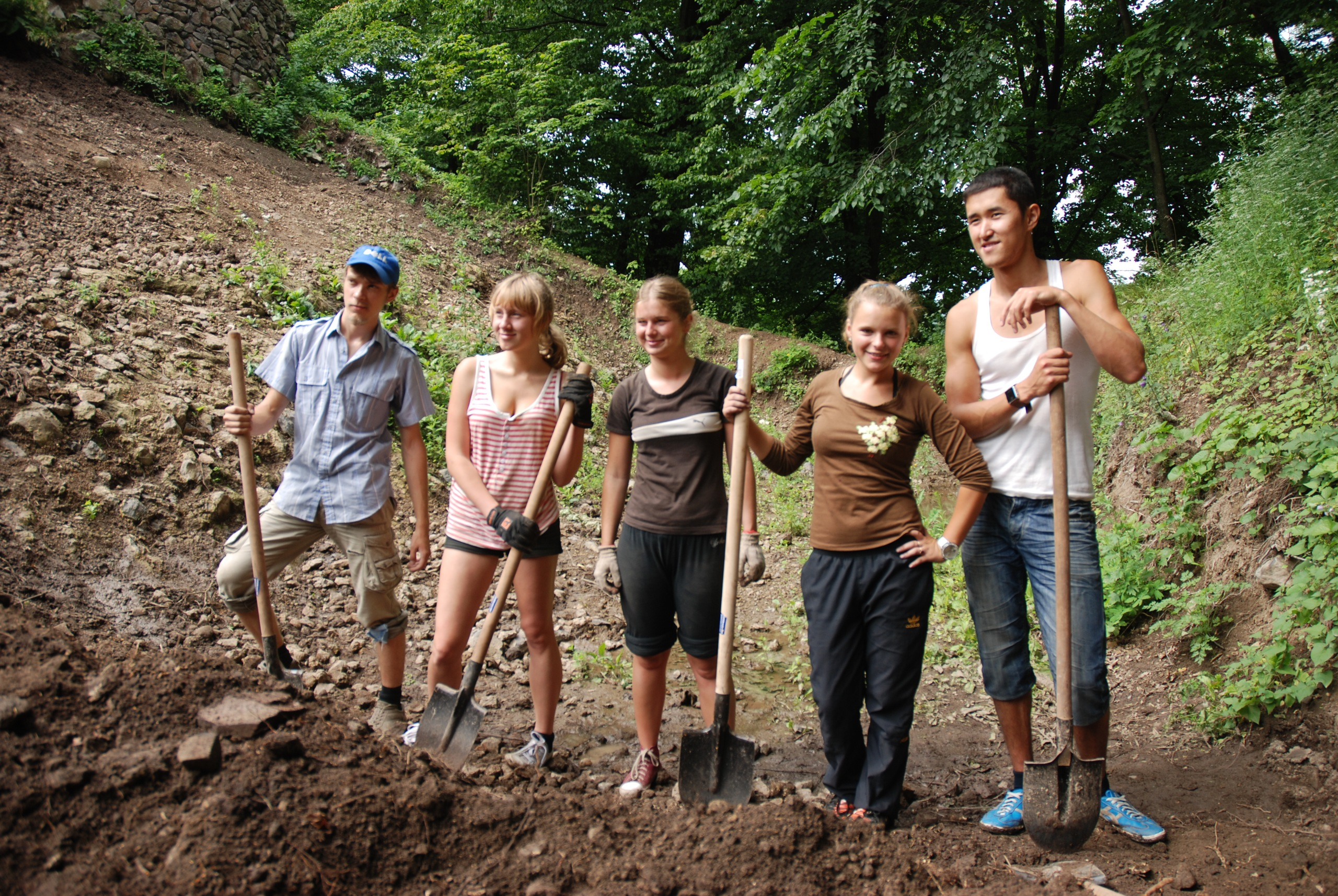
European Voluntary Service project in Ukraine

The European Solidarity Corps, known until 2016 as European Voluntary Service (EVS), is an international volunteering program by the European Commission for young people to go individually or in teams to another country, usually from one European country to another, to work for a non-profit cause. Since 2017, the program has also offered opportunities for European youth to get engaged as volunteers in their own communities.

== History ==
Since the early 1990s, the European Commission was engaged in financing international voluntary service projects for young people as part of the program Youth for Europe. The Association of Voluntary Service Organisations, then known as Steering Group of Voluntary Organisations (CC-EYE), was active in lobbying for the rights of volunteers during this period. In 1996, the European Voluntary Service was established, when 200 volunteers were sent abroad for six to twelve months in a pilot project.

The European Voluntary Service was the second of the five "actions" of the European Union's programme Youth in Action. Until 2016, more than 100,000 volunteers had participated in the European Voluntary Service program. In 2017 and 2018, the European Voluntary Service was replaced by the European Solidarity Corps, which is an expanded version of the European Voluntary Service.

The program is being administered by the Directorate General for Education and Culture of the European Commission.

== Conditions ==
The European Solidarity Corps is open for young people between 18 and 30 years old from Europe and "partner countries" of the European Union. It offers two ways for young people to get active:

- as volunteers abroad in other usually European countries
- as volunteers at home in "solidarity projects" that they set up themselves

For volunteering abroad projects, the European Commission provides grants to organisations who then can publish calls for volunteers. Young people need to have a supporting organisation (also called sending organisation) in the home country of the volunteer. The supporting organisation prepares the volunteer for their experience abroad and manages the administration of the program together with the hosting organisation that receives the volunteer.

Individual volunteering projects usually last between 2 and 12 months, although projects for people with fewer opportunities or disabilities can also be as short as two weeks. Team volunteering projects, similar to workcamps, can last between 2 weeks and 2 months and involve between 10 and 40 volunteers from at least two countries. Volunteers work full-time in their projects, between 30 and 38 hours a week.

The grant covers insurance, linguistic support, travel to and from the project, accommodation and food as well as a small allowance for personal expenses. For volunteers with special needs (e.g. volunteers with disabilities), more costs might be covered.
