= Ceresole =

Ceresole may refer to:

- Ceresole Alba, a municipality in the Province of Cuneo, Piedmont, Italy
- Ceresole Reale, a municipality in the Province of Turin, Piedmont, Italy
- Battle of Ceresole, a battle during the Italian War of 1542–1546, occurring in April 1544 at Ceresole Alba

== See also ==
- Paul Cérésole (1832–1905), member of the Swiss Federal Council (1870–1875)
- Pierre Cérésole (1879–1945), Swiss pacifist
- Norberto Ceresole (1943–2003), Argentine sociologist
- Cerisoles, a French minesweeper, built in 1918 by Canadian Car and Foundry, lost on her maiden voyage on Lake Superior
