= Gerson Gu-Konu =

Togolese peace and human rights activist

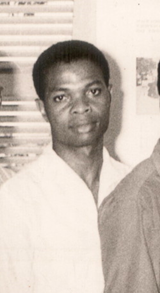
Gerson Gu-Konu (1961)

Gerson Gu-Konu, also Gerson Konu, real name Kwadzo Gaglo Gù-Konu (1932–2006), was a peace and human rights activist and member of the Parliament of Togo.

== Life ==
Gerson Gu-Konu was born in 1932 in Kuma-Adame, in the Southwest of Togo. He did his primary education in Kpalime. He continued his secondary studies until 1949 at the Collège moderne de Lomé (known as Petit Dakar at the time). He started his professional life as a teacher for the Evangelical Mission, first in Kpalime, then in Lomé until 1954 before returning to Kpalime where he continued teaching at the Collège Espoir until 1956.

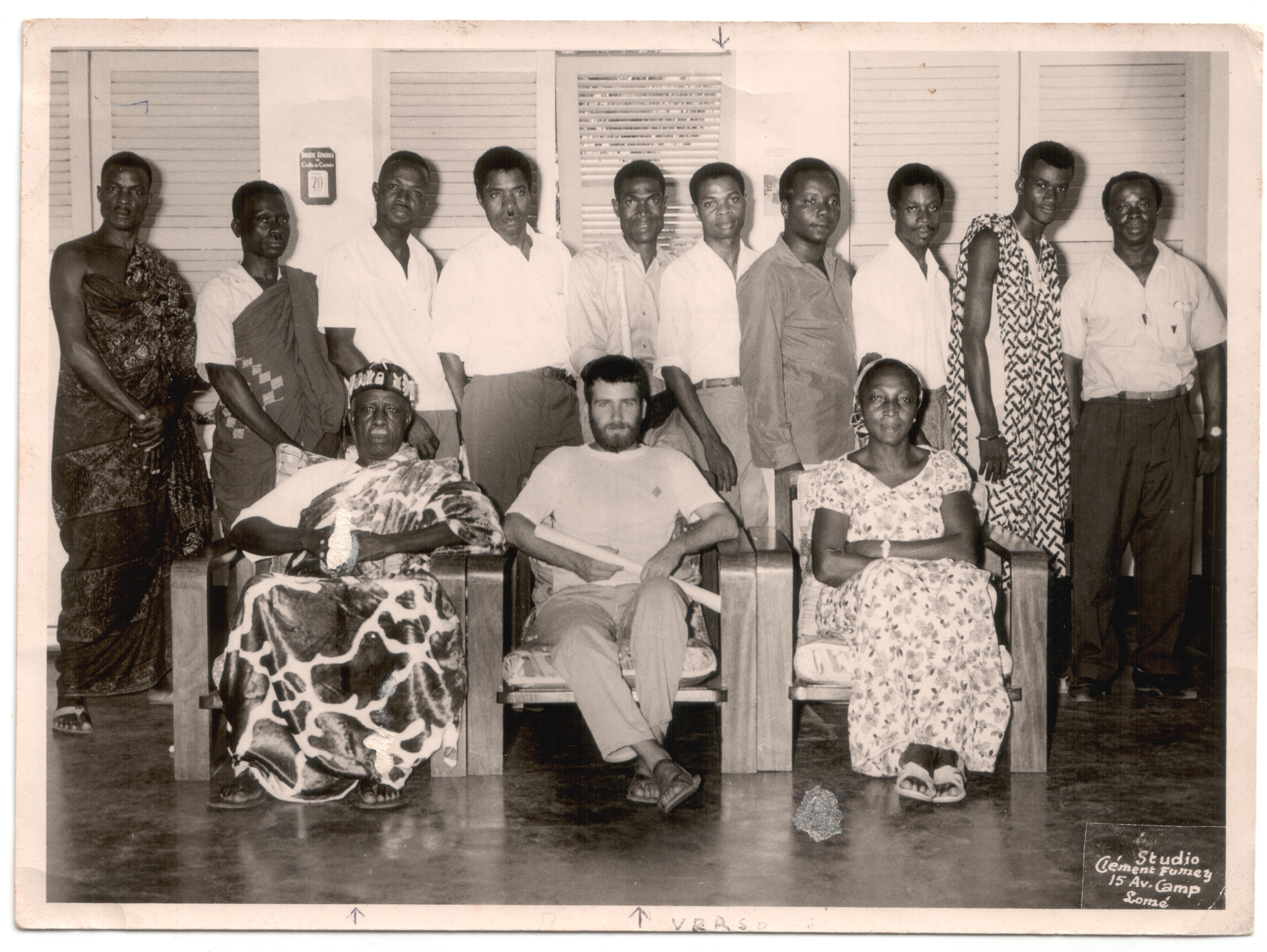
Group photo with Les Volontaires aux Travailles with Gerson Gu-Konu standing (6th from the left)

In 1955, he founded an association called in French Les Volontaires au travail (LVT) - The Volunteers At Work. 1957 he discovered international voluntary workcamps in Ghana, and heard the first time about Service Civil International (SCI).

In 1960 Togo became independent and Gerson Gu-Konu was elected Member of Parliament for the region of Kpalimé. He supported the first president Sylvanus Olympio. After the coup d’état of 1963, and the assassination of President Olympio, Gerson Gu-Konu was arrested and tortured. He was freed four years later thanks to petitioning by Amnesty International (AI) and the International Voluntary Service (IVS), the British branch of the SCI. He then fled to France where he found work in SCI Paris office, and became a member of staff. From 1970 to 1978 he was SCI International Secretary for West Africa.

In 1978, he went to work for the International Secretariat of Amnesty International in London. He was in charge of the development and support of AI branches in Africa. Throughout his exile, he was threatened by the régime in Togo, and was not even able to visit his homeland. He became very ill, and on retiring shared his time between London and Ho, a small village in Ghana not far from the Togolese border.

== See also ==
- List of peace activists

== Bibliography ==
- Gerson Konu (1932–2006), in: Words about Deeds : one hundred years of international voluntary service for peace : Service Civil International 1920–2020, edited by Chantal Doran, Heinz Gabathuler, Philipp Rodriguez. Antwerpen: SCI International Secretariat; La Chaux-de-Fonds: SCI International Archives, Bibliothèque de la Ville 2019, ISBN 9789463965385. Page 86.
- Nigel Watt: First communist in Fort Jameson, recollections of africa and other places 1955-2018. Books of Africa, London 2018. ISBN 9780993503672. Page 140.
- Olivier Bertrand: Breaking down barriers 1945–1975, 30 years of voluntary service for peace with Service Civil International, Paris 2008.

== Sources ==
- Nigel Watt: Gerson Gu-Konu, in: The Guardian, 31. August 2006
- Steven Hogg: In Memoriam of Gerson Konu, Service Civil International – International Archives, 15. December 2006
- Godwin Tete: Togo: Hommage à un grand combattant de la liberté, Gerson Gu-Konu, 12. December 2006, letogolais.com
