= Bilthoven Meetings =

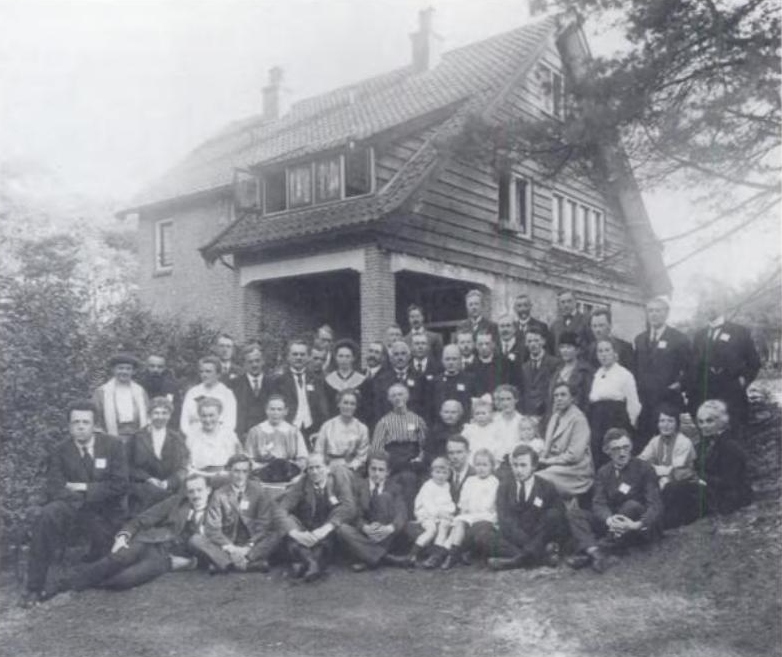
Meeting of the International Fellowship of Reconciliation in Bithoven (1919)

The Bilthoven Meetings were a series of networking and capacity building meetings of pacifist activists after World War I in the town of Bilthoven in the Netherlands. The activists gathered under the name of Movement Towards a Christian International, which was later renamed to International Fellowship of Reconciliation. The meetings took place at the house of Kees Boeke, a Quaker missionary and pacifist.

The meetings were fundamental for the development of the international peace movement in the first half of the 20th century, as they resulted in the creation of three international peace organisations between 1919 and 1921: International Fellowship of Reconciliation (IFOR), Service Civil international (SCI) and War Resisters' International (WRI).

== Three Meetings ==
=== October 1919 ===
The invitation to the first of the three meetings was issued by Ernest and Eveline Fletcher, Kees Boeke and Henry Hodgkin for participants to attend an international peace conference to take place between 4-19 October 1919. Fifty participants attended this meeting, among them people from Germany, Norway, Sweden, Denmark, Finland, France, Switzerland and the USA. Notable attendees included Friedrich Siegmund-Schultze, J. B. Hugenholz, Mathilda Wrede, Lilian Stevenson, Leonhard Ragaz and Pierre Cérésole. Many of the participants were conscientious objectors who were detained during World War I. Cérésole was appointed as conference secretary due to his extensive language skills.

=== August 1920 ===
The second Bilthoven meeting took place in July 1920. Here, Pierre Cérésole suggested to organise international workcamps as a means to foster reconciliation by rebuilding infrastructure destroyed during World War I. The work was to be organised in a way similar to the reconstruction efforts of the Quakers in Poland and France. This suggestion was positively received by those at the meeting, notably a German man whose brother had been involved in the destruction of Northern France as a soldier and now wished to be involved in the reconstruction.

The first reconstruction camp took place in November 1920 in the village of Esnes, which had been destroyed in 1916 during the Battle of Verdun. The village was chosen also in order to foster reconciliation between French and German citizens. For the project, Cérésole enlisted the help of English Quaker Hubert Parris for his experience in organizing relief work. The project eventually had to be cancelled due to resentment from local French towards the German volunteers as the scars of World War I were still fresh. Inspired by the efforts of the volunteers, Cérésole conceptualized a voluntary service as an alternative to countries' mandatory military service. This became known as Service Civil International (SCI).

=== March 1921 ===
A short conference with representatives of European peace activists took place in Bilthoven from 22-25 March, 1921. Together with Helene Stöcker, they founded the Paco ("peace" in Esperanto) movement, which in 1923 changed its name to War Resisters International. Following the conference, the founders of Paco took part in the International Anti-Militarist Union (IAMV) in The Hague on 26 March.

== Formation of pacifist networks ==
Before World War I, there were some international pacifist networks such as the International Peace Bureau (since 1891) and the IAMV (since 1904). The atrocities of World War I increased anti-war sentiments and in this context, the Bilthovenen meetings brought together three complementary attitudes of the organisations in the emerging international peace movement:

- the Christian pacifism of the International Fellowship of Reconciliation
- the alternative to military service of the Service Civil International
- conscientious objection by War Resisters International.

These pacifist networks built relationships with other international movements of the time. Associated with them were the Quakers, the Esperanto movement, Montessori education as well as the Women's International League for Peace and Freedom.
