= International volunteering =

Paid travel which includes volunteering for a charitable cause

International volunteering is when volunteers contribute their time to work for organisations or causes outside their home countries. International volunteering has a long association with international development or environment, with the aim of bringing benefits to host communities. It can include a range of services, from healthcare advancement to economic development to governance.

Trends show that international volunteering has become increasingly popular across many countries over the past few decades. International volunteering is a broad term which is used to capture multi-year, skilled placements as well as short term roles. The term voluntourism has become common to describe certain types of volunteering organised by governments, charities and travel agents.

== History ==
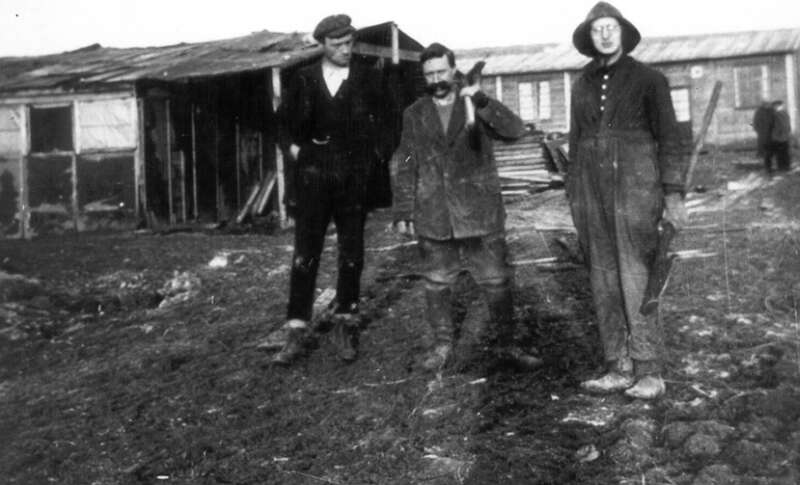
Pierre Cérésole and international volunteers at the first workcamp in France in 1920

On a large scale, workcamps after World War I and early missionary service were the first expressions of international service. Formal overseas volunteering can be traced back over one hundred years to when the British Red Cross set up the Voluntary Aid Detachment (VAD) scheme in 1909. The VAD volunteers, as well as volunteers from many other national Red Cross organisations, worked in battlefields across Europe and the Middle East during World War I to treat soldiers and civilians regardless of the side they fought for. One of the most prominent organisations, Service Civil International, organised workcamps from 1920 on as a form of post-war reconciliation and was formally established in 1934.

Up to the mid-20th century overseas volunteering projects were mainly undertaken by people with direct connections to a particular cause and were considered more as short term in nature. The more formal inception of international volunteering organisations can be linked to organisations such as Australian Volunteers International (formerly the Volunteer Graduate Scheme) which formed in 1951, International Voluntary Services in 1953 in the United States, and Voluntary Services Overseas (VSO) in 1958 the United Kingdom. These services and that of the U.S. Peace Corps, established in 1961 during the Kennedy administration, paved the way for broader recognition of overseas volunteering in later years. During the 1960s and 1970s a movement of volunteerism and study abroad programs became popular among university students and graduates and the United Nations launched the UN Volunteers programme for young professionals to take part in a long-term (two year plus) overseas programme.

In the late 20th century, there was also a notable emergence of medical international volunteering in response to the lack of qualified healthcare personnel in developing countries. This called for the employment of doctors and nurses in third-world countries, practicing Western medicine in non-Western environments. The growing interest in international volunteering was facilitated, in part, by globalisation as it fostered cross-cultural exchange, collaboration, and networking among all parties involved. It also played a pivotal role in the increased sense of global connectivity and awareness of health disparities and humanitarian needs. Global health initiatives underwent a shift from disease-specific interventions to the advancement of internal healthcare systems. This change was brought about by an increased presence of non-communicable diseases rooted in unhealthy diets, substance abuse, physical inactivity, and exposure to unclean and hazardous energy sources. At this time, The World Health Organisation (WHO) rapidly diverted energy to revitalizing efforts that would effectively bolster health systems. Volunteering with organisations such as Global Medical Brigades exemplified goals of the WHO and were increasingly sought after by undergraduate students, medical students, and healthcare professionals.

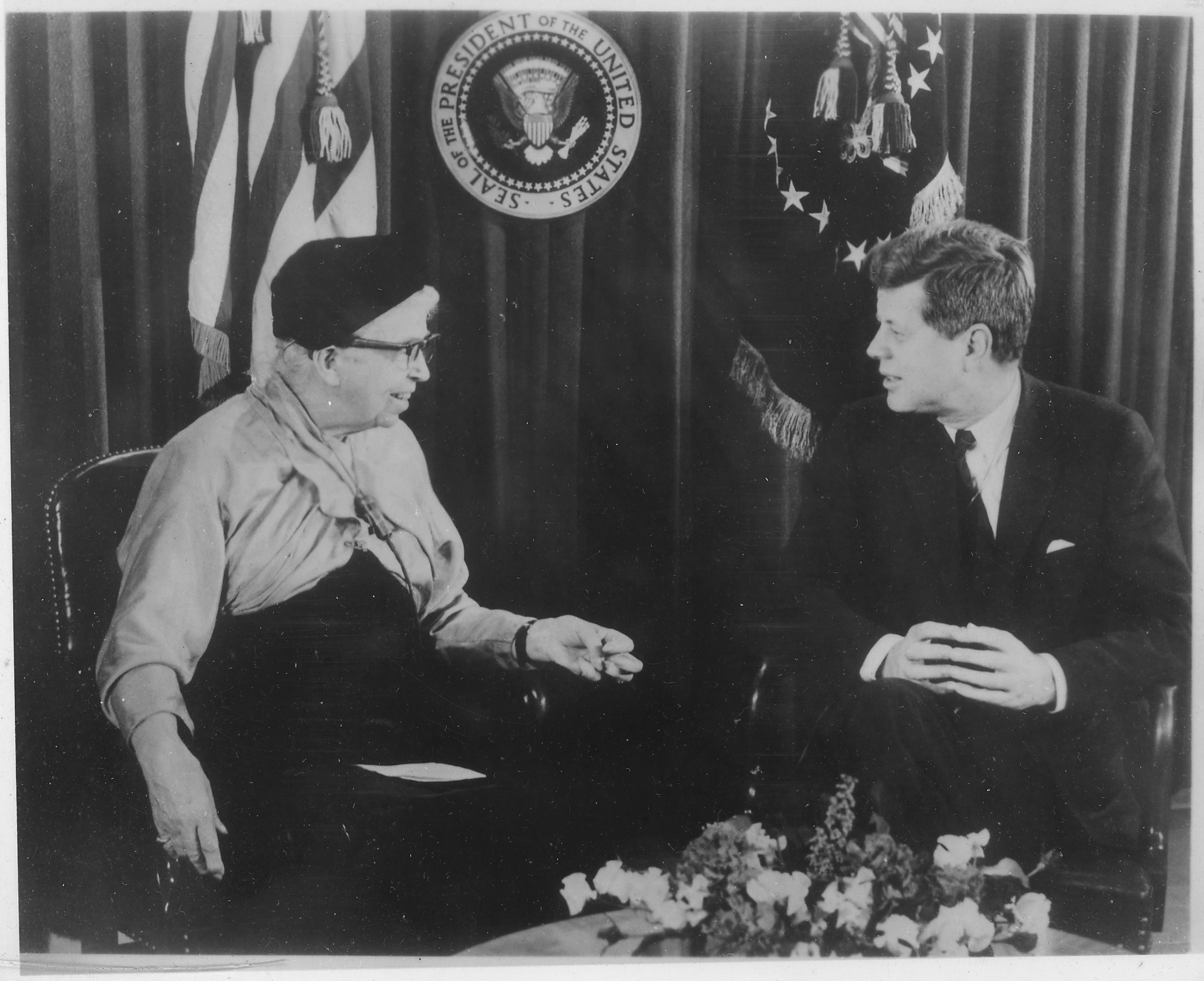
Eleanor Roosevelt and President John F. Kennedy discuss the Peace Corps, 1961.

In recent years the accessibility of international volunteering for US Americans has increased significantly with many smaller charities connecting volunteers with non-governmental organisations in developing countries. About half of all international volunteering from the US takes place through faith-based organisations. For-profit travel companies have also increasingly been offering paid-for volunteering opportunities, this growth coincided with the increasing number of young people taking gap years and has been termed volunteer tourism and voluntourism to denote shorter-term voluntary work that is not necessarily the sole purpose of the trip. However, many opportunities medium- and long-term opportunities for skilled international volunteers remain, for example, the publicised role of volunteers in addressing the Ebola virus epidemic in West Africa. According to US Current Population Survey, the most common activities volunteers engage in abroad include tutoring or teaching, mentoring youth, engaging in general labor, and providing counseling, medical care, or protective services.

== Limited volunteer demographics ==
According to the 2022 State of the World's Volunteerism Report, nearly 15 percent of the global working-age population (aged 15 and above) volunteers each month, corresponding to approximately 862 million people. From the US, about one million people volunteer abroad each year—almost half for less than two weeks. Shorter-term voluntourism is therefore appealing to many, as it is targeted at travellers who want to make a positive change in the world, while still providing a touristic experience. Volunteering appeals to a broad cross-section of society, but the majority of volunteers are in their twenties and thirties, potentially due to perceptions of volunteering abroad being a more risky activity. The average age of Voluntary Service Overseas (VSO) volunteers, however, is 38, showing a broad range of participation across age groups. Recently there has been an increase in baby boomer volunteers. One possible explanation for the increase is that these people are transitioning into a new stage of life and their focus may shift toward finding activities that give their life new meaning. As with domestic volunteering, international volunteering is more common among those with a higher education and from higher income households.

== Critiques and challenges ==
Certain critiques and challenges are associated with international volunteering.

=== Outcomes ===
Measuring the outcomes of international volunteering is an ongoing challenge. Sometimes the costs invested in these partnerships are high. The intangible nature of impact and outcomes is hard to measure and research has been proposed in this area. Similarly, how to measure the success of a volunteer and the supporting organisation's performance is complicated. To allow volunteers to integrate properly into the community, it is essential that volunteers have some useful skills and are reasonably well-informed and trained before the placement. Shannon O'Donnell, a vocal critic of poorly designed international programs, contends that many volunteer organisations compromise the dignity of local populations—these programs often foster a cyclical dependency international volunteers within the communities the programs are designed to serve. Others have critiqued the mixing of models of volunteering designed for international understanding and those designed for social or economic development. Still others are concerned about its postcolonial and historical character, and the impacts this has on the identity of members of hosting communities.

=== High costs ===
Related to the impact of international volunteering, the cost of having an international volunteer has been cited as another area of concern, especially costs for air tickets, allowances (such as for housing and food), insurance, training and logistics. Local staff do not require long-distance travel costs, although they do require payment, and the local organisations could put these funds into other activities; however, many volunteers pay these expenses personally. Some institutions provide scholarships for international volunteering.

Still, volunteers are often cheaper than other forms of long-term technical assistance because they live and work under local conditions. Expatriates who work in the same capacity can be paid multiple times more than any allowances volunteers receive (if any). The cost-benefit of international volunteers is hard to quantify, though studies have highlighted improvements in well-being and inter-cultural understanding in communities and schools as a result of international exchanges and volunteers.

=== Undermining local organisations ===
One consideration is that volunteers may dominate the local workplace, replace local employment, and undermine management and work culture especially in small organisations and schools. This is due to volunteers often being considered more highly educated than local staff, even if they do not often have much direct experience.

Coming from a different culture can also lead to volunteers imposing their values on organisations. For example, different cultures have different ideas on whether it is more important to finish a project by a deadline, or to be active in the social life of the community, and a person who values punctuality may be annoyed that work stops for a funeral, while the person who values the community may be annoyed at the heartless-seeming person who wants to skip the funeral. Similarly, different cultures have different values about some business matters, with differing ideas about where the line is drawn between impermissible levels of nepotism and building valuable relationships and endorsements. Volunteers are often trained to respect the local working culture and ethics.

Since they report directly to local organisations, they can (and sometimes do) have their contracts terminated if they break any local regulations, which helps to reduce concerns of domination.

=== Low skills and experience ===
Young and inexperienced international volunteers sometimes do not have the correct skillset to achieve the project goal. While this may be fine for volunteer workcamps and volunteer trips designed around enhancing international and intercultural understanding, it is a significant problem for international development volunteering (IDV). On the other hand, many of the most prominent international volunteer cooperation organisations (IVCOs)—especially those funded by governments—have minimal educational and skill requirements.

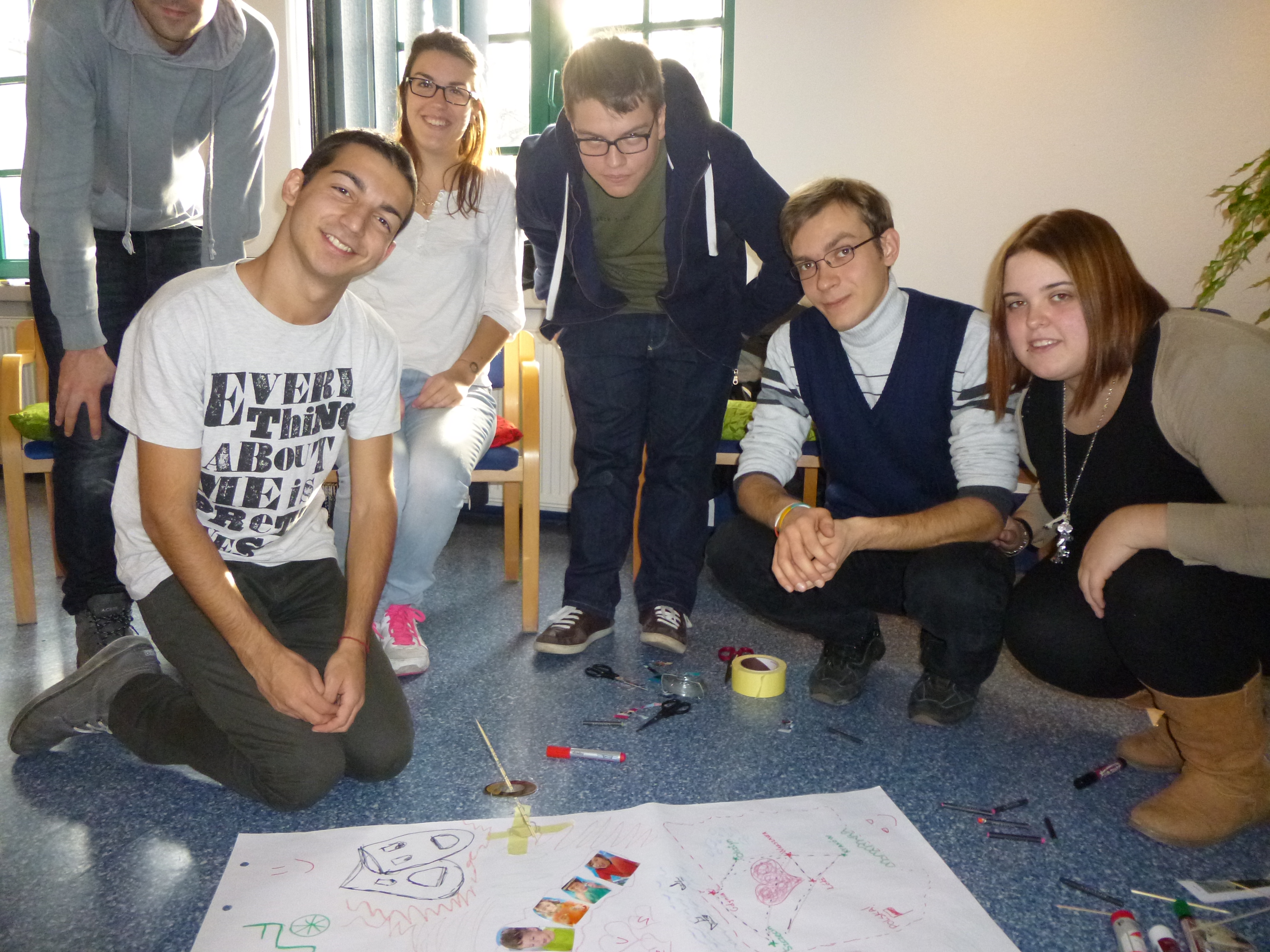
A group of European Voluntary Service volunteers during training

=== Poor understandings of local context ===
International volunteers from outside the host community can lack an understanding of the local context. While there is often a vetting or selection process for volunteers before they are recruited to serve in developing countries, this process has at times been found wanting. Large international volunteer cooperation organisations (IVCOs) provide their volunteers with significant training before and often their placement, which can help address this deficit. On the other hand, countless smaller and for-profit IVCOs offering unskilled volunteer placements to any participant willing to pay the placement fee rarely provide the type of training and preparation that volunteers need to be successful and helpful in hosting communities. In these circumstances, there is conflict about whether the fees volunteers pay justify the time spent supervising and revising their work, and if a sufficient portion of the fees make it back to the local communities hosting volunteers who are typically responsible for their supervision and training.

=== Neo-colonialism ===
There have been allegations from some quarters of neo-colonial advances disguised as an effort to tackle poverty, as some volunteer organisations are connected to national governments, e.g. the Peace Corps, which was set up by the American government. Despite this challenge, most volunteer organisations are non-governmental (NGOs) and are not influenced by government policies. The present structures of international volunteering are also often aimed at impacts on a local, community scale which is sharply in contrast with the macro-political government strategies of the colonial era.

However, many academic journals elaborate that volunteers often have little knowledge or expertise in the work they do when volunteering abroad. This has raised concerns of its value. Frances Brown and Derek Hall write that this creates a neo-colonial narrative; they say the volunteer perspective is framed around the idea that Westerners with minimal experience can effect change in the Global South, just by nature of being from the West. This assumption often overlooks and undermines the knowledge, skills, and capacities already present within local communities, who are frequently better equipped to address their own challenges. Additionally, this system perpetuates the narrative of Western domination in a post-colonial world, and the need to "save" and "help" the Global South.

== Motivations of volunteers ==
People volunteer for many reasons, but seldom does anyone volunteer strictly for monetary reasons, as very few organisations offer a stipend for volunteering. More compelling motives include experiencing another culture, meeting new people, and advancing one's career prospects. Such motivations are common among younger volunteers who are looking for experience or direction in their careers. People generally volunteer in order to increase their international awareness, to contextualise poverty and its effects, as an education opportunity, and to help people while having a morally rewarding experience. Many believe that the trip will change the way they think when they return home. However, others are just looking to give to others and do not believe that their experience will cause them to think twice about their lives back home. Many participants use these trips to boost their resumes, travel with friends, gain world experience, and see new countries.

A common motivation is to "make a difference" and to "achieve something positive for others" who are less fortunate than the volunteer. Many volunteers tend to concur that there are disadvantaged people in their home countries, but the scale of disadvantage outside their home countries is felt to be greater. Volunteering at home may elicit images of helping the less fortunate, or campaigning with a local pressure group. Volunteering abroad has tended to be associated with international development and bridging the divide between the rich and poor worlds. Volunteering abroad often seems a more worthy contribution in this context to the volunteers than work in their own country. This perspective is particularly true of volunteers who are older and looking for something more value-based as they near the end of their professional careers or after their children have left home.

It is argued that volunteers are categorised by their motivation "based on six main criteria: destination, duration of project, focus of experience (self-interest versus altruistic), qualifications, active versus passive participation, and level of contribution to locals. Certain data has encouraged researchers to propose a conceptual structure of volunteers, classifying them as shallow, intermediate, and deep. The latter represented those who are prone to volunteer due to the hosting communities' needs, suggesting an authentic motivation of wanting to provide aid where it is needed. A shallow and intermediate volunteer is more so dominated by personal interests, with intermediate suggesting both altruistic and authentic motives.

== Voluntourism (volunteer tourism) ==
=== Definition ===
Volunteer tourism, also known as "voluntourism", is a specific kind of international volunteering. It is a relatively new concept, combining the nonprofit sector and the tourism sector. Essentially, it is a form of international traveling to resource poor settings, with a primary purpose of volunteering and serving the host community. Voluntourism activities are generally temporary attempts to address education, health, environmental and economic issues. Ideally, voluntourism activities are conducted by non-profit organisations for the purpose of societal good, and poses a chance for volunteers to help and benefit others in an unconventional setting with their skills. Those activities are characterised by the age of the participants, and by the length of time they volunteer abroad. Participants are often young adults (ages 15–30), the length of the trip is often categorised as short term (under three months), and the volunteering is regularly packaged with adventure and travel activities. Voluntourism has undergone intense scrutiny over the course of the 2000s, and an increasing number of academic papers question volunteer tourists' motivations and experiences. A term for a similar phenomenon to voluntourism in the area of teaching English as a second or foreign language is "TEFL tourism".

=== Growth of voluntourism ===
As a variation of international volunteering, voluntourism's development can be traced back to over a century ago. According to National Public Radio, it is one of the most rapid growing trends in modern travel, with more than 1.6 million volunteer-tourists spending around two billion dollars each year.

=== Voluntourism in India ===
India is a land of diverse cultures, rich traditions, and religious heritage, shaped by Hinduism, Sikhism, Buddhism, Jainism, and many other faiths. From the Himalayan ranges and the Aravalli Hills to the Chota Nagpur Plateau and the world’s oldest geological formations, India offers multiple opportunities for nature lovers, cultural explorers, and volunteers from around the world.

Margastha Research Foundation aims to connect international volunteers with local hosts in the Himalayan region and other parts of India, promoting responsible voluntourism, cultural exchange, and community engagement. This initiative is led by Shri Ranjan Shaw, a researcher, botanist, environmental conservationist, and travel enthusiast.

Through its platform, Margastha seeks to provide authentic host contact information and reliable information about local communities, traditions, lifestyles, and cultural heritage. The goal is to help volunteers experience the real India beyond conventional tourism while fostering meaningful connections between visitors and local communities through responsible travel, cultural understanding, and nature-based experiences.

=== Criticisms ===
Voluntourism programs are more often conducted by profit-making companies rather than charities. Although the intention for volunteers to travel is to empower the local communities, the ultimate motivation of the volunteers is more self-serving. According to a study done by Rebecca Tiessen, the motivations identified by the participants generally fit under the category of personal growth (e.g. skill development, cross-cultural understanding, career choice, etc.), while motivations related to having a positive social impact or desire for social justice in the host communities was not found among the participants, reflecting a one-directional flow of benefits from the host communities to the volunteers. With this trend, communities, journalists, and those who have actually done volunteer activities start to question to which extent voluntourism activities can actually help with the local condition, or will they actually bring harm to the already underprivileged places.

Volunteer-sending organisations, such as Free The Children's Me to We trips, the British company Projects-abroad, and AIESEC, have been critiqued as furthering the aforementioned neo-colonial narrative to youth. The increased prevalence of promotional material regarding trips to "help" the Global South has "increased media exposure in the Global North to poverty in the Global South." Critics argue that the way in which these organisations advertise their trips stigmatises and frames the developing world as helpless. This plays into Maria Eriksson Baaz's theories in the book Paternalism of Partnership: a Postcolonial Reading of Identity in Development Aid, in which she discusses discourse that frames the volunteer as a developed, paternalistic individual and the donor as underdeveloped. The framing and "othering" of cultures outside the West and Global North can also be found in Edward Said's text, Orientalism. His theory is rooted in the same idea, in which he describes West's patronizing portrayals of the East. Volunteer tourism relies on historic roots of colonial perpetuated narratives of racial inferiority/superiority, by pushing the idea that whiteness is associated with progress and therefore further reinforces a white saviour industrial complex that reaffirms unequal power dynamics between the "Global North" and "Global South".

Other criticisms of the voluntourism industry are that not only are short-term volunteers often untrained in the projects they participate in (building schools, health centres, wells), but that projects can fuel conflict among communities, offer bandaid solutions, replace work locals could be doing, and reinforce neoliberal policies. Interactions with children are highly popular amongst voluntourism programs. As a consequence, children in these communities may become dependent and commodified when volunteers are constantly arriving and departing every couple weeks. Orphanage volunteering is also an emerging program, which can fuel human trafficking or child abuse in the host communities, and harm the children's development; according to UNICEF, in Nepal, 85% of all children living in orphanages have at least one living parent. Campaigning organisation Orphanages – Not The Solution, based in Cambodia, estimates that three quarters of children in orphanages in the country are not orphans. They claim that orphanage numbers have increased as a direct result of volunteer tourism, with orphanages training children to attract foreign donors for income. The rhetoric of such volunteer-sending organisations has also been argued to inform a "consumer-capitalist" culture that plays to the wants and needs of the privileged North, at the disadvantage of the Global South.

== See also ==
- Agroecology
- Career-oriented social networking market
- InterVol
- Kibbutz volunteers
- Peace Corps
- Service learning
- Virtual volunteering
- Voluntary Service Overseas
