= Yehuda Bacon =

Israeli artist (born 1929)

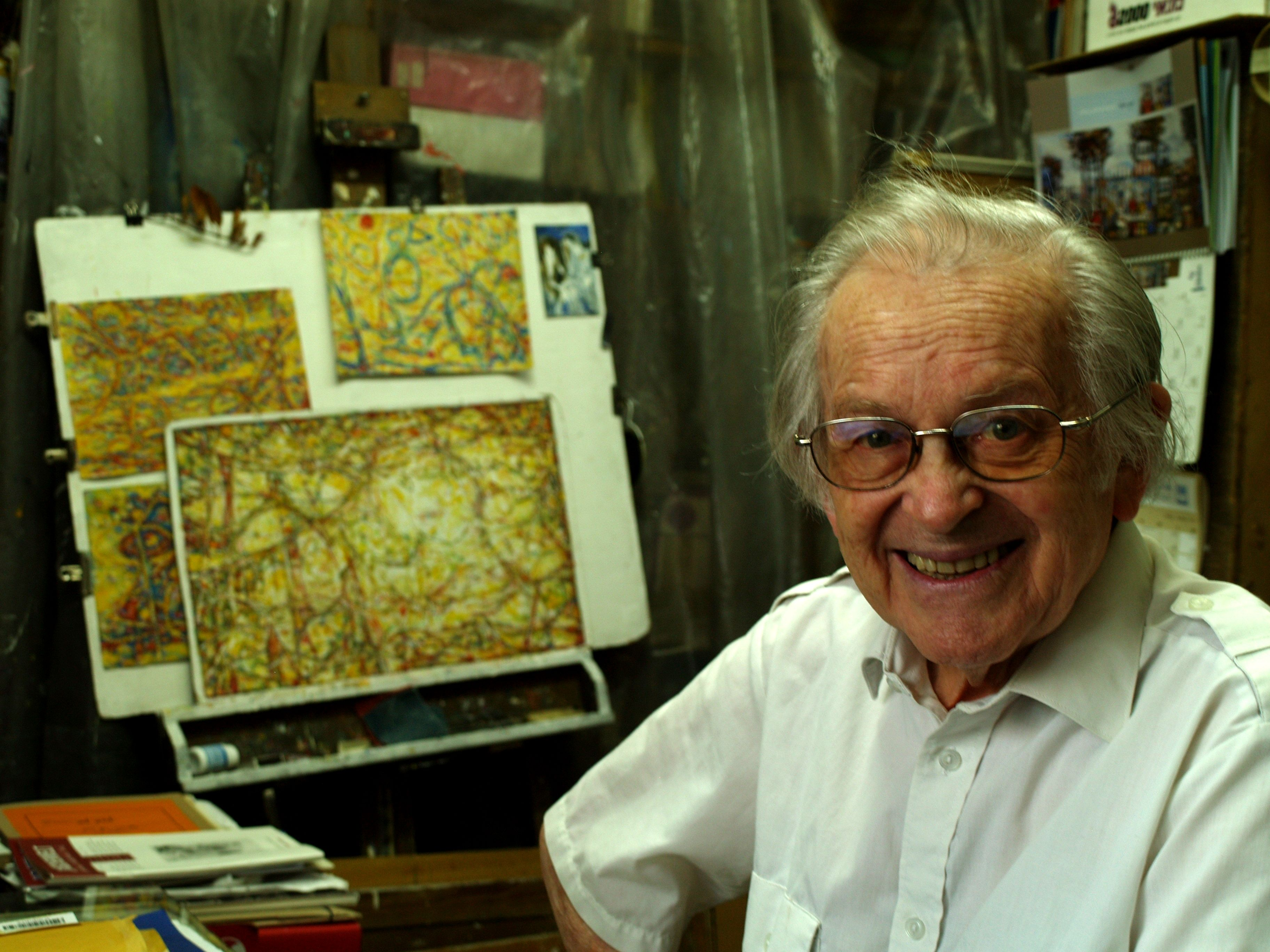
Yehuda Bacon, 2008

Yehuda Bacon (Hebrew: יהודה בקון; born July 28, 1929) is an Israeli artist and Holocaust survivor.

== Biography ==
Yehuda Bacon was born into a Hasidic (Orthodox Jewish) family in Ostrava, then part of Czechoslovakia. In the fall of 1942, at the age of 13, Bacon was deported with his family from Ostrava to the Ghetto Theresienstadt, where he shared a room with George Brady. In Theresienstadt he played in the children's opera Brundibár. In December 1943, he was deported to the concentration and extermination camp Auschwitz-Birkenau, where he and other imprisoned children were used to bedazzle the International Committee of the Red Cross in the so-called "family camp". In fact, the "Birkenau Boys" were used for transport work in the entire complex of Auschwitz II-Birkenau.

In June 1944, Bacon saw his father murdered in the gas chambers. At this time, his mother and his sister Hanna were deported to the Stutthof concentration camp, where they died a few weeks before its liberation. On January 18, 1945, Bacon was sent on the camp's death march, which lasted three days and led him through the Mauthausen-Gusen concentration camp to its subcamp Gunskirchen. In March, Bacon was sent on another death march to a subcamp of Mauthausen, Gunskirchen, in the woods. As he reports, there was no food, water or clothing. On May 5, 1945, Bacon was liberated by the US Army. Before the SS guards left the camp, they poisoned the rest of the food. After fleeing to a village, many inmates died from eating too much too suddenly, in amounts their bodies could no longer handle. Bacon and his friend Wolfie Adler (who later became an Israeli rabbi and published a book about his experiences) left the camp. US soldiers brought them to a hospital in the Austrian town Steyr.

After his recovery, Bacon returned to Prague hoping to reunite with his mother and sisters. He lived in an orphanage not far from Prague in Štiřín, which was established by the Czech educator and humanist Přemysl Pitter. The writer H.G. Adler was also a teacher there. Through Pitter and Adler, he found a way to live after the liberation.

In 1946, Bacon immigrated to Israel with the help of Youth Aliyah. There he studied at Bezalel Academy of Arts and Design. In 1959, he became a professor of graphic art and drawing at Bezalel.

Yehuda Bacon lives with his wife Leah Bacon in Katamon neighborhood of Jerusalem. He has two sons and a daughter by a former marriage to Josephine Bacon.

== Art career ==
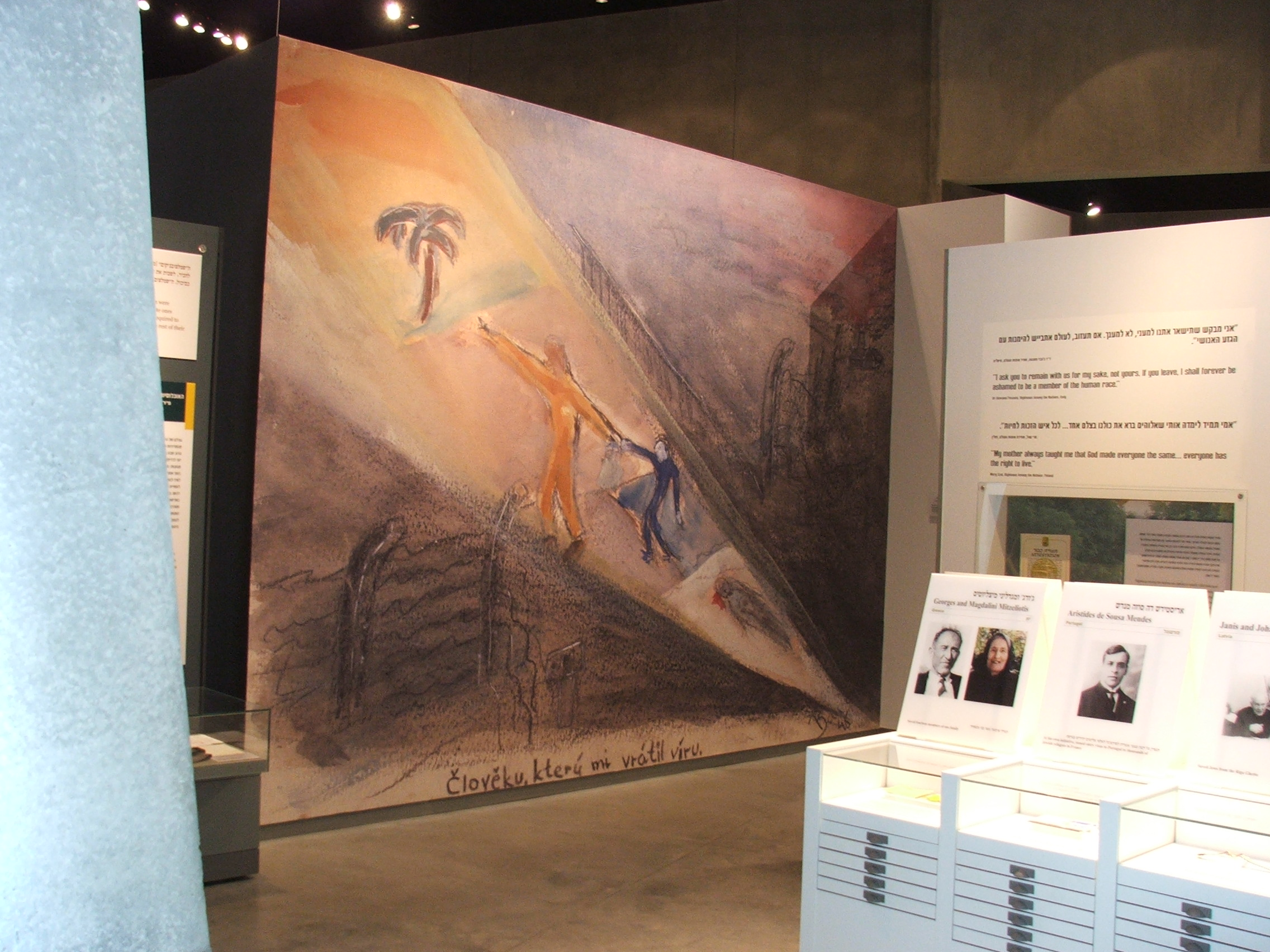
Reproduction of Bacon painting, Yad Vashem, Jerusalem

After liberation, Bacon decided to become an artist to process his experiences and try to describe what he lived through. As a survivor he feels a responsibility to tell his story and to make future generations aware of their responsibility in the present and future. He was among the first survivors of the Shoah to set foot again on German soil.

Bacon's drawings show details and sequences of what he saw in the concentration camps and scenes he drew as a teenager shortly after the liberation. His drawings served as evidence in trials against Nazi criminals (including the Eichmann trial in Jerusalem and the Frankfurt Auschwitz Trials) and were used in the litigation against Holocaust denier David Irving, who challenges the existence of gas chambers in Auschwitz.

His art is a kind of asynergistic interaction: on the one hand, Bacon processes the experiences of his childhood and youth in the concentration camps, on the other he is searching for a way of understanding through his art. Bacon was early part of interfaith dialogues and Israeli-Palestinian dialogue in the 1950s. His art is shown in several museums and collections around the world, among the Israel Museum and Yad Vashem in Jerusalem, the United States Congress in Washington, D.C., in the homes of Theodore Roosevelt, John D. Rockefeller, Martin Buber and Chaim Weizmann as well as in London.

== Collections ==
- Yad Vashem, Jerusalem
- Ghetto Fighters' House Museum, Western Galilee
- Victoria and Albert Museum, London
- British Museum, London
- Imperial War Museum, London
- Magnes Museum, Berkeley
- Museum am Dom, Würzburg

== Solo exhibitions ==
- Nora Gallery, Jerusalem (1954)
- Whippmann Gallery, Johannesburg (1955)
- Princeton University, Princeton (1973)
- Lutheran Education Center, Munich (1978)
- Portland City Hall, Portland, Oregon (1988)
- SOCA Gallery, Auckland (1995)
- Studio Visuri Osmo, Helsinki (1999)
- Spectrum Gallery, Frankfurt (2004)
- Museum am Dom, Würzburg (2008)
- Czech Centre, Prague (2011)

== Group exhibitions ==
- Henny Handler, London (1987) starring Naomi Blake
- St. Paul's Church, Frankfurt (1999) with Dan Richter-Levin
- Art Museum, Tel Aviv (1952) with Isidor Aschheim, Naftali Bezem, Nahum Gutman, Aviva Uri, et al.
- 45e Exposition de la Maison des intellectuels, Paris (1962)
- National Museum of Modern Art, Tokyo (1962)
- Pratt Graphic Art Center, New York (1966)
- Art Gallery, São Paulo, (1967) by Mordechai Ardon, Moshe Castel, Jacob Pins, Anna Ticho, Yigael Tumarkin, et al.
- Gallery of Modern Art Rijeka, Ljublijana (1968)
- Musée d'Art Moderne, Paris (1981)
- Imperial War Museum, London (2001)
- The Brooklyn Museum of Art, New York (2003)
- Los Angeles Museum, California 2004
- Ben Uri Gallery, London (2008) - Israel and Art - 60 years through the eyes of Teddy Kolek

== See also ==
- Visual arts in Israel
