= Moorefield, Ontario =

Coordinates: 43.7596°N 80.7477°W

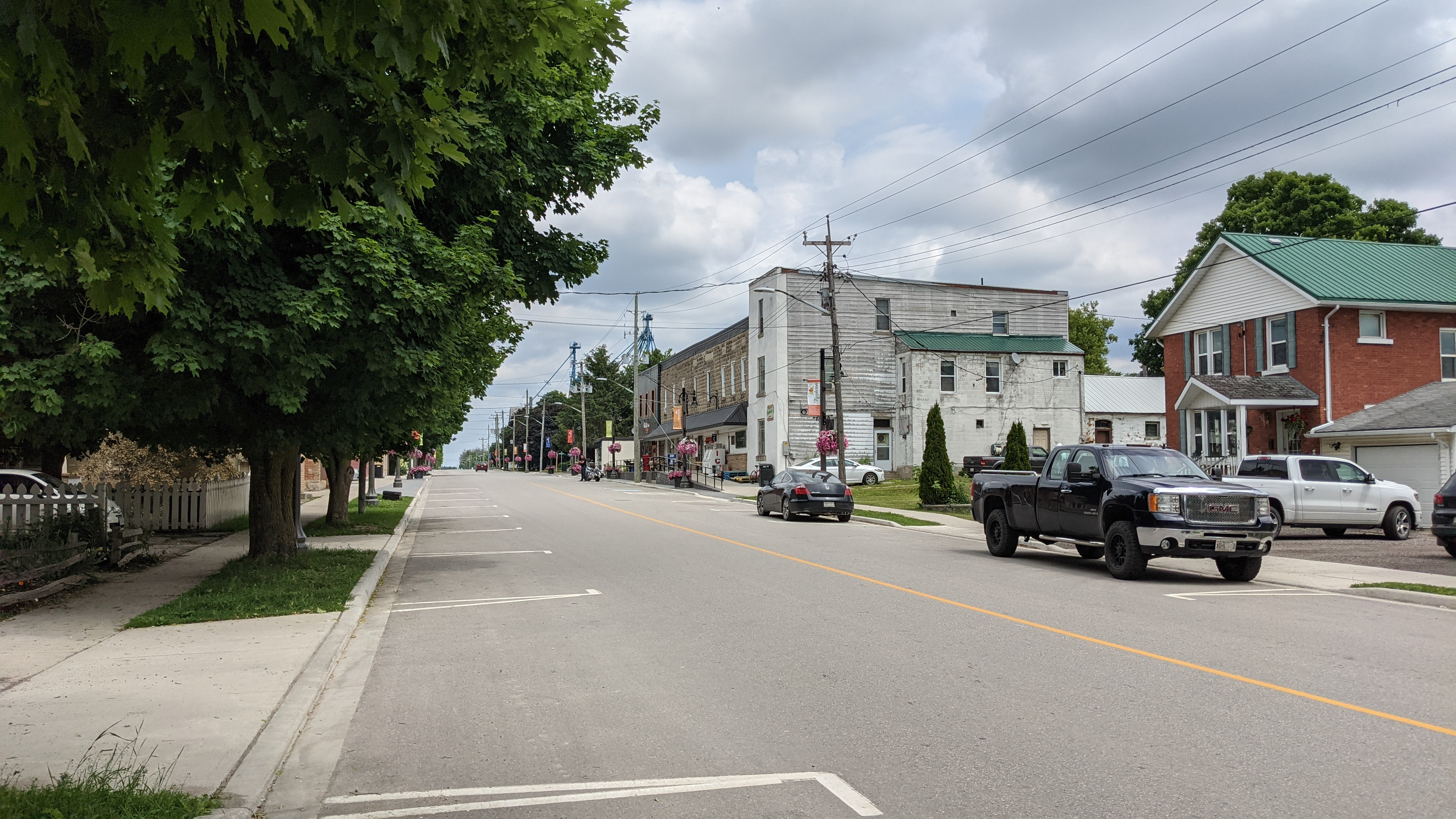
Downtown Moorefield

Moorefield is a community in Southwestern Ontario, located within the Wellington County township of Mapleton.

== History ==
The founder of Moorefield, Richard C. Moore, was the son of a Baptist missionary who came to Canada intent on establishing a church and converts in North America. Richard, as well as his brother George C. Moore, had involvement in various business ventures in the area. The family moved to the new township of Maryborough in the 1850s and established the church which the town was built around.

The earliest property deed listed for St. John's Anglican Church, Moorefield, is dated 23 July 1859 (Ledger A, begun in 1883), indicating an early departure from the Baptist roots.

== Notable people ==
- Bert Johnson (1939 – ), politician
- J. Lavell Smith (1892 – 1973), educator, administrator, and advocate of pacifism
