= Přemysl Pitter =

Czech humanist, pacifist, pedagogue, social worker (1895-1976)

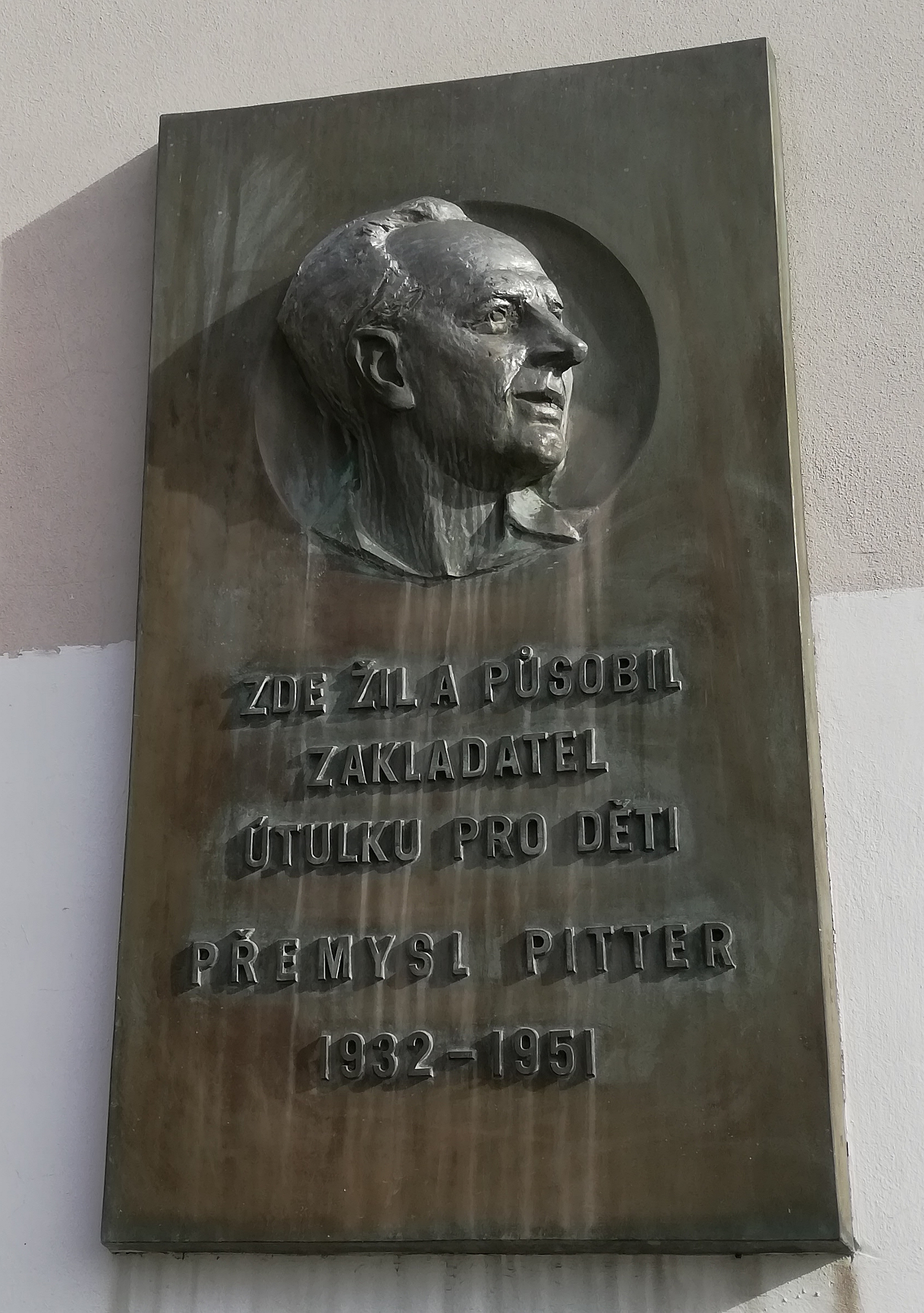
Memorial plaque to Pitter at Milíč House in Prague

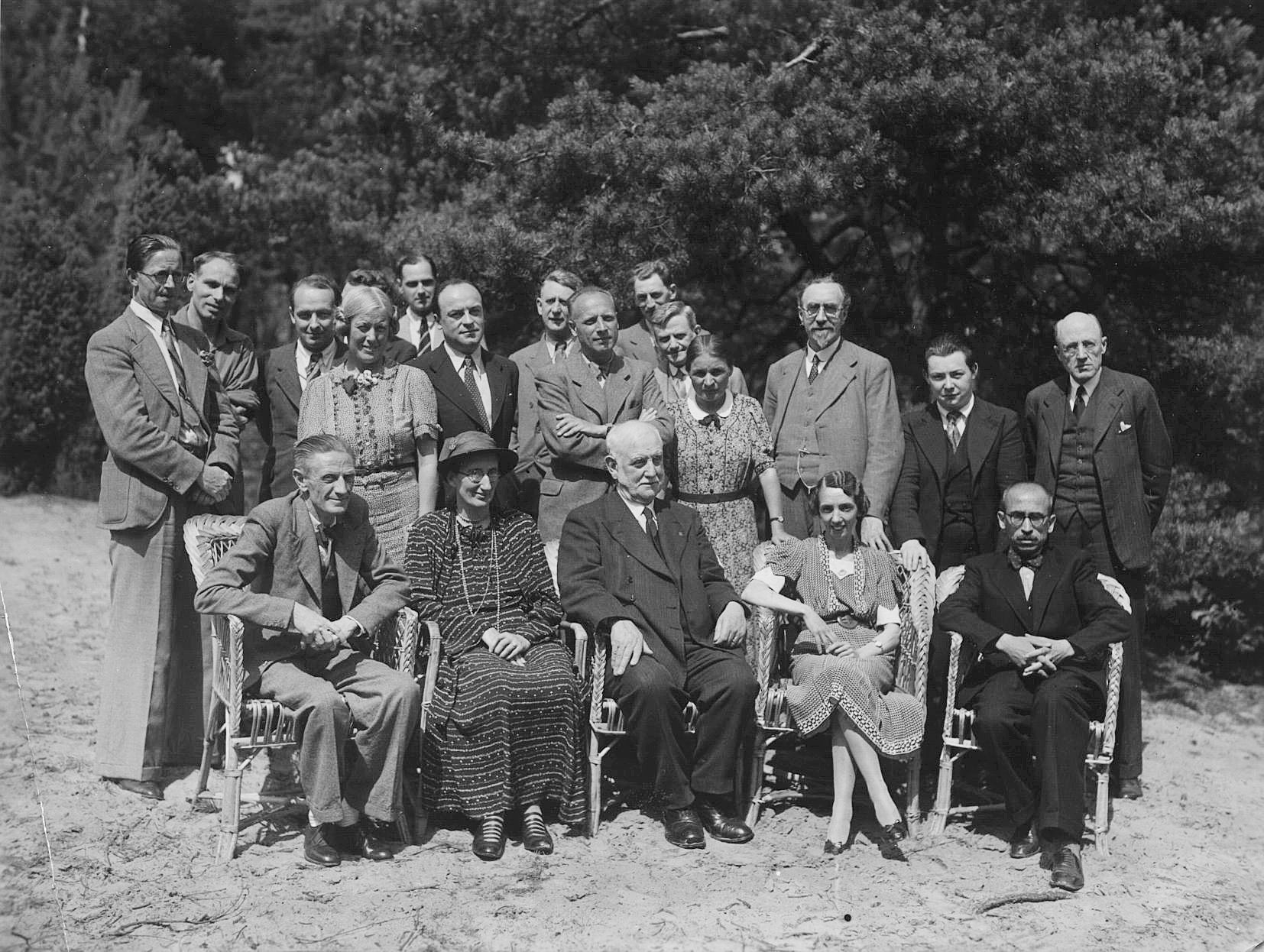
Photo 7 Council 1938, WRI

Přemysl Pitter (21 June 1895 – 15 February 1976) was a Czech humanist, pacifist, pedagogue, social worker and evangelical preacher. He founded Milíč House in Prague, during World War II supported Jewish families and after the end of the war organized the “Operation Castles” in which he and his colleagues provided health and social care for children from German concentration camps as well as those from Czech internment camps. After the onset of the communist regime, he was forced to emigrate. First, he worked in Germany, where he provided pastoral and social support to the refugees in the Valka refugee camp near Nuremberg, then lived in Switzerland. Přemysl Pitter was named Righteous Among the Nations by the Israeli government, in 1973 he was awarded The Order of Merit Ist Class of the Federal Republic of Germany and in 1991 President Václav Havel conferred upon Přemysl Pitter the Order of Tomáš Garrigue Masaryk, in memorian.

== Early life ==
Přemysl Pitter was born on 21 June 1895 in Prague - Smíchov to Karel Pitter, owner of a printing company, and his wife Žofie Pitter (née Hořejší). His six siblings died in infancy, so he grew up as an only child. He studied at a typographical school and a business college in Prague between 1911 and 1912. He attended a printing school in Leipzig.

He was deeply affected by the death of his mother in 1911 and his father in 1913; the printing company he inherited was in financial trouble. In an attempt to solve his problems, Pitter enlisted as a volunteer during World War I. His terrible war experience affected him for the rest of his life; he returned a devout Christian and a pacifist. He decided to dedicate his life to helping others.

== Public activity 1920-1938 ==
After the war, he began to dedicate himself to public and educational activities. He lectured at various places and began organising activities for socially endangered children in Prague Žižkov. He also became a member of many associations, such as The Academic YMCA, The War Resisters´ International, International Fellowship of Reconciliation (IFOR), Czechoslovak Vegetarian Club, League Against Anti-Semitism, and The League for Human Rights. Between 1924 and 1941, he published and edited the magazine Sbratření (Fraternisation). He participated in an international conference of the International Fellowship of Reconciliation in Oberammergau in 1926, where he met the teacher Olga Fierz, for the rest of his life. Fierz was his closest associate.

Working for children was his most important activity. He founded The Building and Housing Association The Milíč House in 1922, and started to collect financial means from donors. The Milíč House was opened on Christmas Day 1933, and children from poor families could spend their free time there with various activities such as singing, handicrafts, table games, theatre play, German courses, cooking, sports games or gardening. Prague Milíč House was based on voluntary cooperation and solidarity.

In 1938, a year-round sanatorium was set up in Mýto by Rokycany. The first inhabitants of the sanatorium were children of refugees from Sudetenland. Several of them managed to leave Czechoslovakia in children´s transports organised by Nicolas Winton.

== Second World War and post-war “Operation Castles” ==
At the time of German occupation, the Milíč House became the centre of secret support for persecuted Jewish families (Pitter visited the family of Petr Ginz, for example). Pitter was interrogated by the Gestapo, and he was released. Immediately after the end of the war, Pitter initiated the “Operation Castles” (1945 – 1947), an action to help children coming back from the concentration camps, among others Yehuda Bacon. Castles Štiřín, Olešovice, Kamenice and Lojovice (near Prague) were transformed into sanatoriums. The “Operation Castles” was soon expanded to help German children from internment camps, too. During the deportations of Germans, Pitter tried to arrange the reunion of the children with their parents or relatives. The search for the lost children was based at the Milíč House office, which cooperated with German search services until 1950. A total of 810 children went through the “Operation Castles” between 1945 and 1947.

== Exile ==
After the February 1948, when the Communists seized power, Pitter and his colleagues began to be persecuted. The Milíč House was transformed into a regular after-school club. Pitter emigrated (under the threat of imprisonment) to the Federal Republic of Germany in summer 1951. He began cooperating with BBC and Radio Free Europe in 1952. For 10 years, Přemysl Pitter and Olga Fierz became social workers in the Valka refugee camp near Nuremberg. Since 1962 they lived in Affoltern am Albis, Switzerland. They published an exile magazine, Hovory s pisateli (Talks with Writers). Pitter was active in immigrant associations. He died in 1976.

== Honors ==
For the rescue of Jewish children, Pitter received the honor of Yad Vashem – The Righteous Among the Nations in 1964. In 1973, Pitter was awarded the Order of Merit 1st Class of the Federal Republic of Germany by the President of Germany Gustav Heinemann. In 1991, President Václav Havel conferred on P. Pitter the Order of Tomas Garrigue Masaryk IIIrd Class in memoriam for outstanding merits for democracy and human rights.
