= Fellowship of Reconciliation =

Religious nonviolent organizations

The Fellowship of Reconciliation (FoR or FOR) is the name used by a number of religious nonviolent organizations, particularly in English-speaking countries. They are linked by affiliation to the International Fellowship of Reconciliation (IFOR).

In the United Kingdom, the acronym "FoR" is normally typeset with a lower-case "o"; elsewhere, it is usually typeset in all capital letters, as "FOR", such as in "IFOR".

== The FoR in the United Kingdom ==
The first body to use the name "Fellowship of Reconciliation" was formed as a result of a pact made in August 1914 at the outbreak of the First World War by two Christians, Henry Hodgkin (an English Quaker) and Friedrich Siegmund-Schultze (a German Lutheran), who were participating in a Christian pacifist conference in Konstanz in southern Germany. On the platform of the railway station at Cologne, they pledged to each other that, "We are one in Christ and can never be at war."

There were a number of people involved in the creation of the organisation, among them Lilian Stevenson, Pierre Cérésole, and its first secretary, Richard Roberts. Stevenson later wrote up the first history of the organisation.

To take that pledge forward, Hodgkin organised in 1915 a conference in Cambridge at which over a hundred Christians of all denominations agreed to found the FoR. They set out the principles that had led them to do so in a statement which became known as "The Basis". It states:

- That love as revealed and interpreted in the life and death of Jesus Christ, involves more than we have yet seen, that is the only power by which evil can be overcome and the only sufficient basis of human society.
- That, in order to establish a world-order based on Love, it is incumbent upon those who believe in this principle to accept it fully, both for themselves and in relation to others and to take the risks involved in doing so in a world which does not yet accept it.
- That therefore, as Christians, we are forbidden to wage war, and that our loyalty to our country, to humanity, to the Church Universal, and to Jesus Christ our Lord and Master, calls us instead to a life-service for the enthronement of Love in personal, commercial and national life.
- That the Power, Wisdom and Love of God stretch far beyond the limits of our present experience, and that He is ever waiting to break forth into human life in new and larger ways.
- That since God manifests Himself in the world through men and women, we offer ourselves to His redemptive purpose to be used by Him in whatever way He may reveal to us.

Because the membership of the FoR included many members of the Society of Friends (Quakers), who reject any form of written creed, it has always been stressed that the Basis is a statement of general agreement rather than a fixed form of words. Nonetheless the Basis has been an important point of reference for many Christian pacifists.

The FoR had a prominent role in acting as a support network for Christian pacifists during the war and supporting them in the difficult choice to become conscientious objectors - and in taking its consequences, which in many cases included imprisonment. In the interwar years it grew to be an influential body in United Kingdom Christianity, with federated associations in all the main denominations (the Anglican Pacifist Fellowship, the Methodist Peace Fellowship, the Baptist Peace Fellowship, etc.) as well as a strong membership among the Society of Friends (Quakers). At one time the Methodist Peace Fellowship claimed a quarter of all Methodist ministers among its members.

During the 1930s, the FoR's members included George Lansbury.

The FoR was active in the anti-war movement of the 1930s, and provided considerable practical support for active pacifism during and after the Spanish Civil War. It could be argued that it lost influence when the Second World War came, was won, and was widely perceived as morally justified, especially as the horrors of Nazism became known in the post-war period. Equally, it could be argued that the questionable morality of the Cold War threat of mutually assured nuclear destruction again vindicated the FoR philosophy. The FoR retained considerable strength in post-WWII British Christianity, and many of its members were active in the Campaign for Nuclear Disarmament in the 1950s and 1960s. Prominent members included Donald Soper, a high-profile President of the Methodist Conference of the period and later a member of the House of Lords. With the continuing decline of Christianity in Britain, the FoR has lost influence, although active Christians in the UK are now probably further to the left politically, on average, than they were in the 1930s or 1950s.

A history of British FoR from 1914 to 1989, entitled Valiant For Peace, was published in 1991.

FoR remains active: Norman Kember, the British peace activist kidnapped in Iraq in December 2005 was a member of the Baptist Peace Fellowship and a Trustee of the FoR in England. There are Roman Catholic members of FoR, and although most Catholic pacifists affiliate instead to the specifically Catholic peace organisation, Pax Christi, FoR and Pax Christi work closely together. Although many members have universalist sympathies and are happy to co-operate with pacifists of other faiths or none, the FoR has remained a distinctively Christian organisation. However, with a number of Hindu, Buddhist and other supporters, members, and staff, there is a degree of flux here as well.

Currently, there are separate FoR organisations for England and Scotland, and for Wales. The Welsh branch is called Cymdeithas y Cymod.

== The FOR in the United States ==
United States Fellowship of Reconciliation (FOR USA) was founded in 1915 by sixty-eight pacifists, including A. J. Muste, Jane Addams and Bishop Paul Jones. Norman Thomas, at first skeptical of its program, joined in 1916 and would become the group's president. It was formed in opposition to the entry of the United States into World War I. The American Civil Liberties Union developed out of FOR's conscientious objectors program and the Emergency Committee for Civil Liberties.

The FOR USA claims to be the "largest, oldest interfaith peace and justice organization in the United States." Its programs and projects involve domestic as well as international issues, and generally emphasize nonviolent alternatives to conflict and the rights of conscience. Unlike the U.K. movements, it is an interfaith body, though its historic roots are in Christianity.

== The FoR in Canada ==
Among the first chapters in Canada were those established in Toronto by Richard Roberts in the late 1920s and in Montreal by J. Lavell Smith in the mid-1930s.

== Fellowship Europe ==
The Fellowship also has a European branch. In the post-World War Two period, the secretary of the European FOR was Pastor André Trocmé, known for saving Jews at Collège Cévenol during the Nazi occupation of France.

== Religious Peace Fellowships ==
Since 1935, FOR has helped form, launch, and strengthen peace fellowships of many faith traditions to form a network of faith-based nonviolent action. Membership of these peace fellowships has changed and grown over the past decades; what follows are fellowships that are currently affiliated with FOR:

- Adventist Peace Fellowship
- Baptist Peace Fellowship
- Buddhist Peace Fellowship
- Catholic Peace Fellowship
- Church of God Peace Fellowship
- Disciples Peace Fellowship
- Episcopal Peace Fellowship
- Jewish Peace Fellowship
- Lutheran Peace Fellowship
- Muslim Peace Fellowship
- Presbyterian Peace Fellowship
- Unitarian Universalist Peace Fellowship

== See also ==
- Buddhist Peace Fellowship
- Fellowship Party
- List of anti-war organizations
- List of peace activists
- War Resisters' International (a more secular organisation).
