= J. Lavell Smith =

Canadian Teacher & Vocal Pacifist

- Born: April 9, 1892; Moorefield, Ontario, Canada
- Died: June 5, 1973 (aged 81); Toronto, Canada
- Education: B.A., Victoria College, 1921; B.D., Union Theological Seminary, 1924; D.D., Victoria College, 1952
- Occupations: School teacher, 1912–15; military officer, 1916–19; Methodist and United Church of Canada Ministry, 1923–57; president, Canadian Fellowship of Reconciliation, 1942–45

J. Lavell Smith (9 April 1892 – 5 June 1973) was a Canadian educator, administrator, and advocate of pacifism.

After serving as a lieutenant during World War I, Smith embraced pacifism under the influence of Reinhold Niebuhr and Harry F. Ward. In 1934 he organized a Canadian version of Hugh Richard Sheppard's Peace Pledge. Protesting militarization in Canada, he organized the Montreal chapter of the Fellowship of Reconciliation.

In 1939, with the start of World War II, Lavell Smith and the pastor of Toronto's Kingston Road United Church, Harold Toye (1884–1974), helped Robert Edis Fairbairn produce and circulate the Witness Against War manifesto signed by numerous United Church ministers.

As the wartime president of the Canadian Fellowship of Reconciliation, Smith encouraged cooperation with other humanitarian groups in assisting refugees and interned Japanese-Canadians, and Smith was "one of the few voices in Canada raised against the Allied strategic bombing of German cities". After World War II, before turning his attention to the antinuclear movement, "Smith was instrumental in the establishment of hostels for European refugee immigrants as well as credit unions and senior-citizen homes". Smith's concept of pacifism centred on the elimination of the causes of war, particularly arms manufacture, international inequality, and social inequality.
