= St. Petersburg High School =

Public school in St. Petersburg, Florida, U.S.

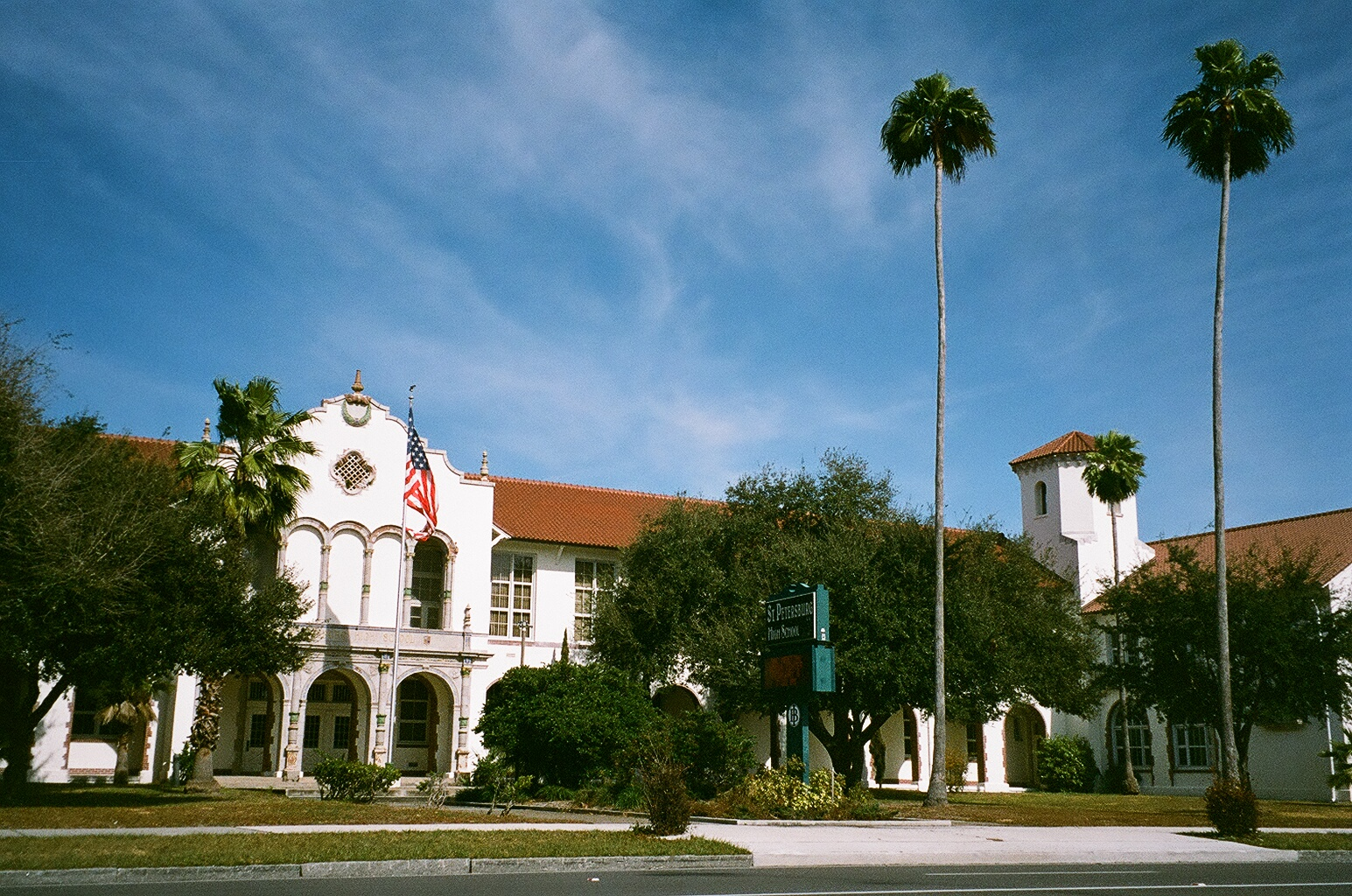

Location
- 2501 5th Avenue North; St. Petersburg, Florida; United States

Information
- Type: Public secondary
- Motto: Loyalty and Service to God, Country and Home
- Established: 1898
- School district: Pinellas County Schools
- Principal: Darlene Lebo
- Teaching staff: 82.00 (FTE)
- Grades: 9–12
- Enrollment: 1,736 (2024-2025)
- Student to teacher ratio: 21.17
- Colors: Green & White / Black (unofficial)
- Mascot: Green Devil
- Accreditation: Florida State Department of Education
- Yearbook: No-So-We-Ea
- Website: Official website

St. Petersburg High School is a secondary school in the Pinellas County School District in St. Petersburg, Florida, United States. It was founded in 1898. The school's current building, a historic landmark, was built in 1926. It was designed by Missouri architect William B. Ittner. It was listed on the National Register of Historic Places in 1984. The school was billed as the nation's first million dollar high school. The school previously occupied several other historic locations around St. Petersburg, including a location at Mirror Lake (1919–1926).

The International Baccalaureate (IB) Diploma Programme at St. Petersburg High School is the oldest in Florida, IB school number 250 in the world.

Effective July 1, 2017, former assistant principal Darlene Lebo was promoted to principal, succeeding Al Bennett who was promoted to become the Pinellas County School District's Director of Athletics, Pre-K-12 Physical Education, Health Education Programs, and School Wellness.

The school currently has 2,013 students enrolled.

== Academics awards ==
- Central High School
- U.S. National Register of Historic Places
- Location: St. Petersburg, Florida
- Coordinates: 27°46′40″N 82°40′6″W
- Built: 1926
- Architect: William B. Ittner
- NRHP reference No.: 84000946
- Added to NRHP: August 1, 1984

- A 2003 Newsweek magazine survey of the top 100 high schools in the United States placed St. Pete High as #25. In 2005 (based on 2004 numbers), the survey ranked the school as #35. In 2006 (based on 2005 numbers), the Newsweek survey ranked the school as #63. The ranking is based on the number of IB or Advanced Placement (AP) exams given at a school divided by the number of graduating seniors.
- Was ranked as the #2 high school in the Tampa Bay area by the Tampa Bay Times in 2013, behind only Pine View School.

== Traditions ==
The campus of the school is also host to a weekly fresh market event. The Kenwood Sunday Market is held from 10 am - 2pm each Sunday, year round. The event is brought to you by Tampa Bay Markets. The focus for the market is fresh, green, renewable and hand made.

== School renovations ==
=== Fire ===
On August 31, 2012, around 4:00 AM, a fire started on the roof above the Auditorium (Theatre). The Fire later spread into the Auditorium and then crept into an equipment room. The School incurred over one million dollars' worth of smoke and water damage. The school's auditorium was reopened to all students on December 11, 2012, after all damage was either replaced or repaired.

=== Renovation project ===
During 2019–2020 school year, the entire campus was upgraded as part of the $32-million project.

== Notable alumni ==
- Jacob Barnes – Major League Baseball (MLB) pitcher
- Charlie Crist (1974) – 44th governor of Florida (2007–11), Florida's attorney general from 2003 to 2006, a U.S. Representative from Florida's 13th district from 2017 to 2022.
- Jim Haslam (1948) – founder of Pilot Corporation
- Ben Hayes (1975) – MLB pitcher
- Gary Hoffman (1974), cellist
- Charles Horton – football player
- Joe S. Lawrie (1932) – U.S. Army major general
- Zac MacMath – goalkeeper in Major League Soccer
- Milt May (1968) – MLB player
- David Mendelblatt – yachtsman and ophthalmologist
- Mark Mendelblatt – yachtsman, silver medalist at 1999 Pan American Games and 2004 Laser World Championships
- Shannon O'Donnell, (2002) – National Geographic Traveler of the Year
- Will Packer – American film producer
- Grady Sutton – actor
- Bill Young – U.S. Congressman from 1971 to 2013

== Former principals ==
- Al Bennett (2006–2017)
- Dr. Julie Janssen (2003–2006)
- Linda Benware (2000–2003)
- Thomas Petit (1995–1999)
- Barbara Broughton (1991–1995)
- William Grey (1983–1991)
- Vyrle Davis Davis (1973–1983) (also first African-American area superintendent in the United States).
- Ronald R. Hallam (1969–1973)
- Fred "Doc" Geneva (1967–1969)
- Douglas McBriarty (1964–1967)
- Dr. Albert J. Geiger (1934–1947)
