= Shannon O'Donnell (writer) =

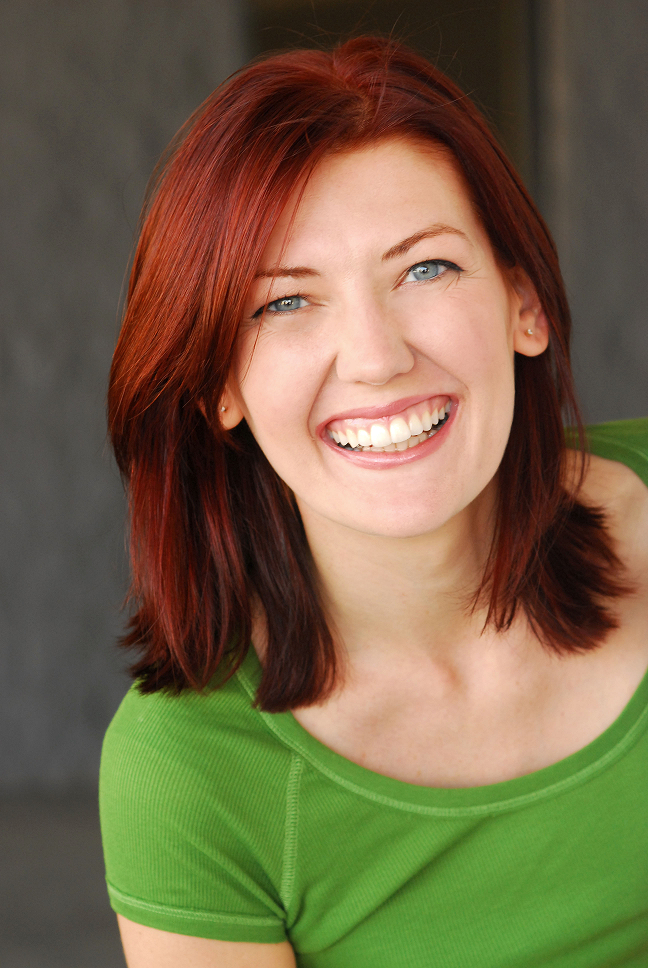
- Born: 1983 (age 42–43); St. Petersburg, Florida, U.S.
- Education: University of Central Florida
- Occupations: Writer; Traveler; Public Speaker
- Website: shannonod.com

Shannon O'Donnell (born 1983) is an American writer, traveler and public speaker. She is best known for A Little Adrift, a travel blog she founded to document her travel and philanthropy throughout the world. In 2013 she was named Traveler of the Year by National Geographic. O'Donnell continues to travel and speaks publicly, focusing on the topic of Voluntourism and global citizenship. She has been featured by media outlets that have included Daily Mail, CNN Money, BBC, National Public Radio and International Business Times.

== Early life and education ==
O'Donnell was born in 1983 and raised in St. Petersburg, Florida, where she attended St. Petersburg High School's IB program and the University of Central Florida. She graduated from UCF in 2006 with a degree in Advertising and Public Relations.

== Career ==
After graduating from UCF, O'Donnell moved to Los Angeles to pursue an acting career. In 2008, she started a new venture when she decided to travel solo around the globe over the course of a year. She sold most of her possessions and drove back across the United States to leave the rest of her things with her parents. She then set off on her round the world journey. To document her travels, O'Donnell launched A Little Adrift, a blog where she now provides advice to other travelers as well as her other travels since the global trip.

O'Donnell began her travel in Sydney and consisted of 15 countries in Asia and Europe. During her travels, she participated in numerous volunteer projects. O'Donnell wrote a book in 2012 called the Volunteer Travelers Handbook. The same year she launched the website Grassroots Volunteering. Her travel and volunteering around the globe caught the attention of and earned her the recognition of being National Geographic's 2013 traveler of the year.

O'Donnell continues to travel and is a public speaker, keynoting at the International Convocation at Shenandoah University in 2013. Additional speaking engagements have included the University of Central Florida in 2013 and a National Geographic Live event held in Washington D.C. in 2014.

== See also ==
- Adventure travel
- Backpacking (travel)
