= Lilian Stevenson =

Irish pacifist

- Born: 16 November 1870; Dublin, Ireland
- Died: 1960 (aged 89–90)
- Known for: militant pacifist, writer

Lilian Sinclair Stevenson (16 November 1870 – 1960) was a Christian peace activist, historiographer and one of the founders of the International Fellowship of Reconciliation.

== Personal life ==
Lilian Stevenson was born in Dublin, Ireland on 16 November 1870 to Reverend William Fleming Stevenson, Presbyterian minister for Christ Church in Rathgar and his wife, Elizabeth Montgomery née Sinclair, a wealthy but religious family. A strong Christian, she became one of the leaders of the Student Christian Movement of Great Britain.

== Career ==
In 1914, she participated in the conference in Cambridge that launched the Christian peace group in the UK. Shortly afterwards, over the Christmas of 1914–1915, this group formed the Fellowship of Reconciliation. She took part in the Bilthoven Meetings of 1919, 1920 and 1921. From the 1919 meeting that brought together some fifty people, her quote of the event was: "We met as strangers: we parted a Fellowship." As a result of these conferences Movement Towards a Christian International (MTCI) became the International Fellowship of Reconciliation (IFOR). Also involved in this was Pierre Cérésole who participated in these meetings and decided to found the Service Civil International in 1920.

In July 1920, a group of Christian pacifists met in Stevenson's home in Cooldara in Ireland for a conference and prayer meeting for Ireland. The group appealed to the churches to take the initiative to call a conference to deal with Irish independence.

Stevenson briefly assumed the General Secretariat of MTCI in 1922. She travelled to Germany in 1932 with an international group to talk to the young socialists and those interested in Hitler. Her writings can trace the history of Christian peace movement in the 20th century.

She died in 1960 and remains known as "the Grand Dame of Christian Pacifism".

== Works ==
In addition to her composition of the words of a hymn, Stevenson wrote several works:

- Mathilda Wrede of Finland: Friend of Prisoners (London: George Allen & Unwin Ltd, 1905)
- Amor Vincit Omnia: Thoughts on the War Together With Notes on What to Read and Helps to Intercession (1914)
- A Child's Bookshelf: Suggestions on Children's Reading, 154 pages, London: Christian Student Movement, 1918 ISBN 9781164235125 (reprint)
- Towards a Christian International: The Story of the International Fellowship of Reconciliation, 1st edition 1929, 2nd edition 1936, 3rd edition 1941 Publisher: IFOR, London
- Max Josef Metzger, Priest and Martyr 1887–1944 With a Selection From His Letters and Poems Written in Prison (London: SPCK, 1952)

== See also ==
- List of peace activists

== Sources ==
- http://www.ifor.org/resources/
- https://www.swarthmore.edu/library/peace/CDGB/IntFellOfReconPhotoCloseUps.html
