= Esnes-en-Argonne =

- Commune
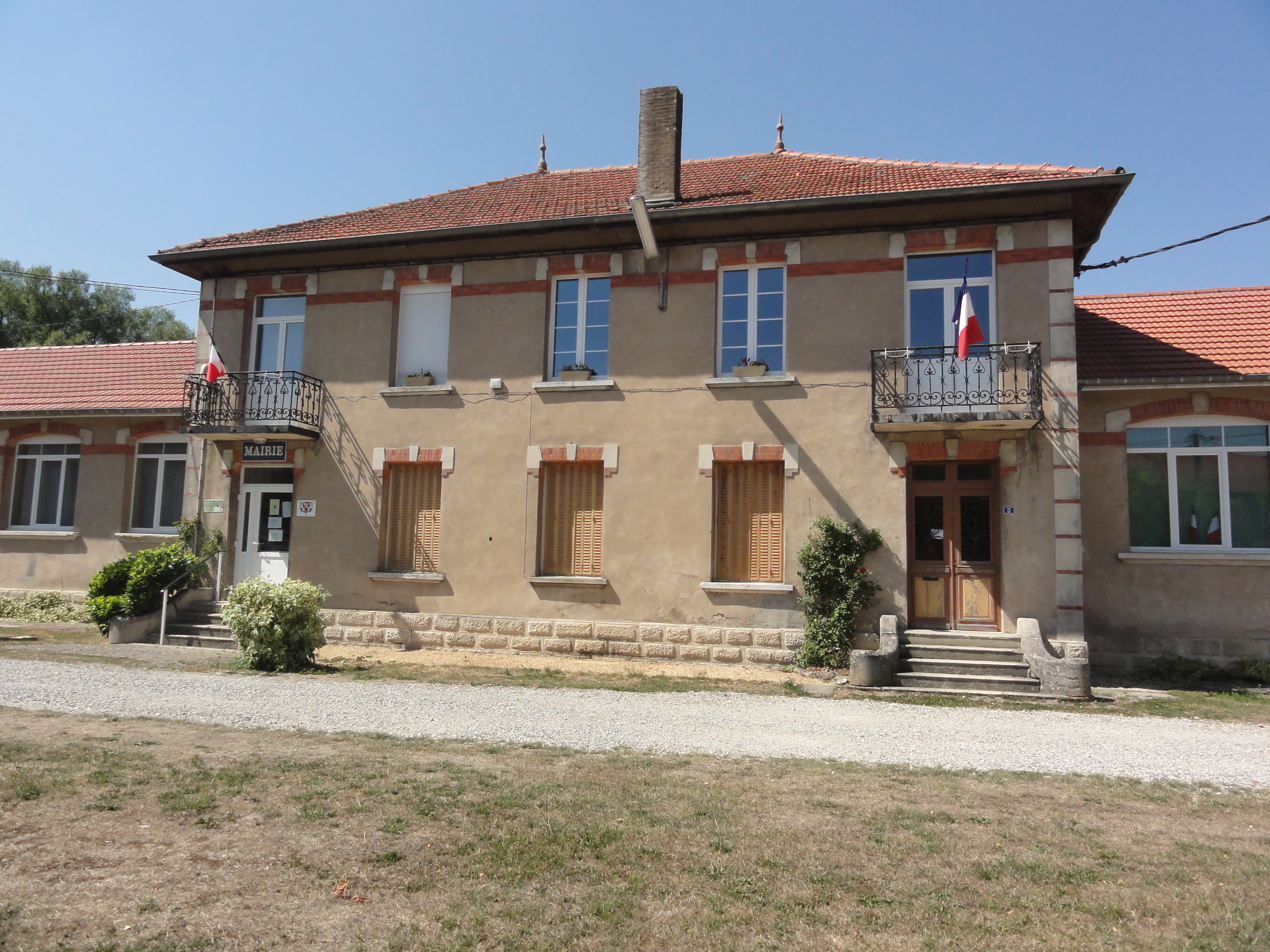
- The town hall in Esnes-en-Argonne

- Coat of arms
- Location of Esnes-en-Argonne
- Location within France Location within Grand Est
- Coordinates: 49°12′31″N 5°12′43″E
- Country: France
- Region: Grand Est
- Department: Meuse
- Arrondissement: Verdun
- Canton: Clermont-en-Argonne
- Intercommunality: Argonne-Meuse

Government
  - Mayor (2020–2026): Véronique Adler
- Area^{1}: 14.76 km^{2} (5.70 sq mi)
- Elevation: 127 m (417 ft)
- Highest elevation: 311 m (1,020 ft)
- Lowest elevation: 205 m (673 ft)
- Population (2023): 135
  - Density: 9.15/km^{2} (23.7/sq mi)
- Time zone: UTC+01:00 (CET)
  - Summer (DST): UTC+02:00 (CEST)
- INSEE/Postal code: 55180 /55100
- ^{1} French Land Register data, which excludes lakes, ponds, glaciers > 1 km^{2} (0.386 sq mi or 247 acres) and river estuaries.

Esnes-en-Argonne (French pronunciation: [ɛn ɑ̃.n‿aʁɡɔn], literally Esnes in Argonne) is a commune in the Meuse department in Grand Est in north-eastern France.

== See also ==
- Communes of the Meuse department
