= Workcamp =

International volunteering organization

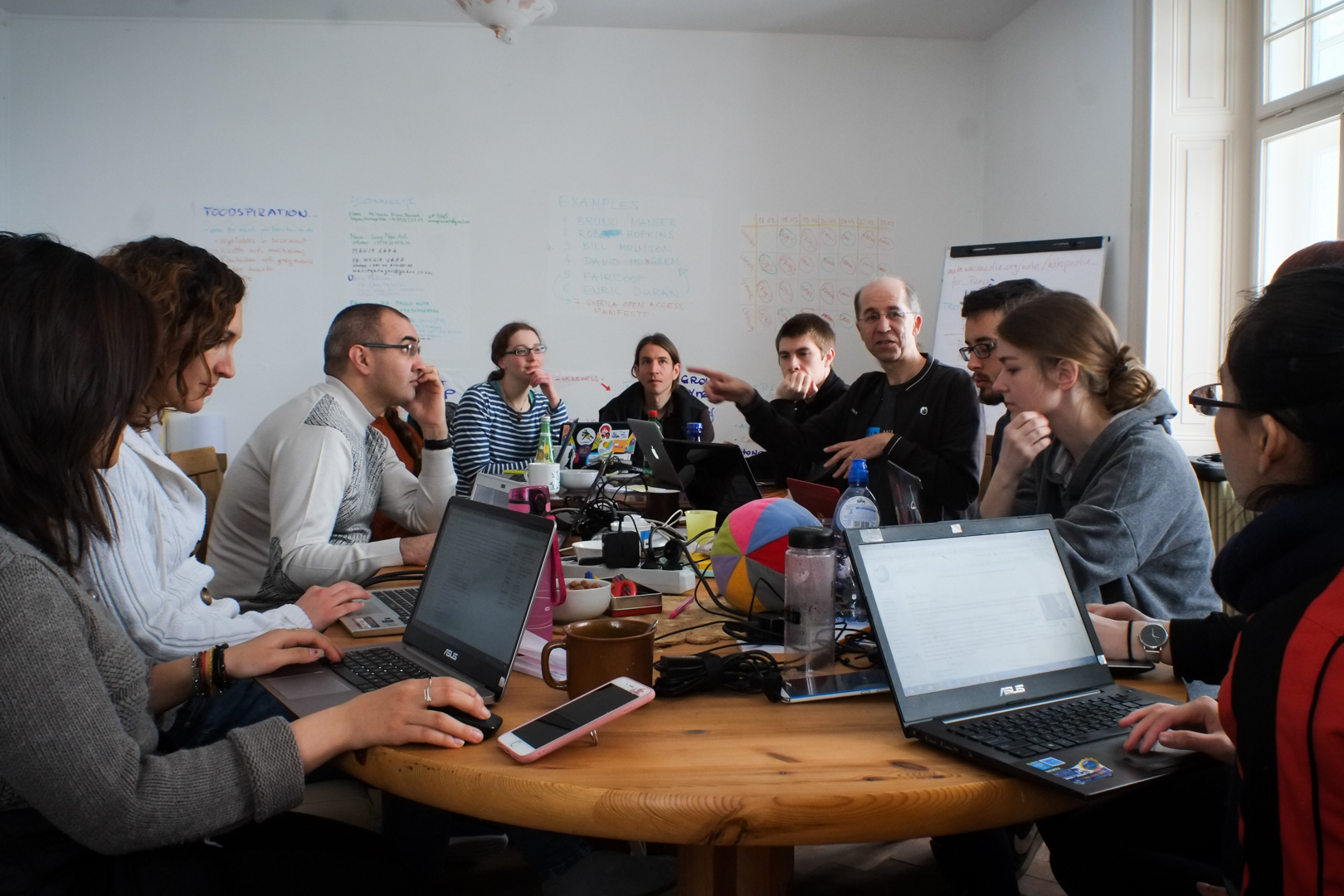
Wikipedia workcamp in Switzerland in 2018

A workcamp in international volunteering, is an arrangement where groups of volunteers from different countries work and live together as a team on a short-term basis and for a not-for-profit cause, usually for one to three weeks. Workcamps are considered one of the most important types of international volunteering programs. They were first introduced in 1920 as a way of bringing people together for increased international understanding and peace reconciliation efforts.

== Concept ==
Workcamp volunteering commonly involves teams of 10–16 young people from multiple countries that live and work together while completing some form of work project. Usually younger people from the ages of 18 on are the main participant group, but some organizations also have camps for teenagers from the age of 15 or specifically for older people. Workcamps typically do not require any special skills or qualifications for volunteers to participate.

International volunteers are supposed to support local communities with their work. There are different types of work depending on the task to carry on, e.g. archaeology, restoration of monuments, environmental protection, community work. While the work itself is an important part of the concept, they also usually to strengthen intercultural understanding, democratic awareness, to increase independence and self-reliance of participants and to increase their understanding of history and politics, with most organisations offering workcamps focusing on the aspect of intercultural understanding. Workcamps are supposed to reduce conflicts and prejudice between people from different national and social backgrounds.

Prices oscillate depending on sending organisation, hosting country, modality and length of the stay. Participants usually must pay for their travel tickets, whereas the hosting organisation would pay for accommodation and meals.

== History ==
From 20 November 1920 to 21 April 1921, the first workcamp of Service Civil International took place in Northern France in order to reconstruct the village Esnes-en-Argonne, damaged in the Battle of Verdun in World War I. Behind this initiative was Swiss pacifist Pierre Cérésole, who came up with the idea at a peace conference in 1920 that was part of the Bilthoven Meetings. He saw this form of volunteering as a way to overcome nationalism and militarism. The English Quaker Hubert Parris, who had experience in organizing relief work, supported Ceresole in preparing the project.

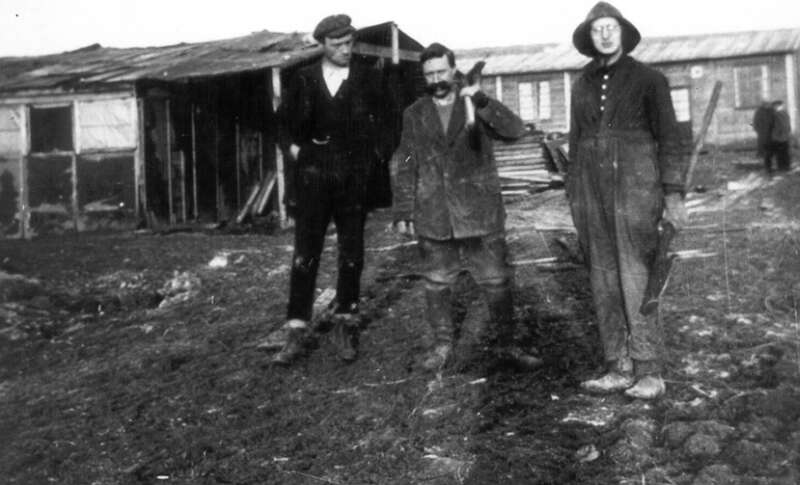
Pierre Cérésole (on the left) in the first workcamp in France in 1920

In the middle of November 1920, Ceresole and Parris started building a shelter for the volunteers who would be arriving in December, among them several German volunteers who had been soldiers during World War I. During the winter months, the volunteers built several huts for the village. Already in January the working conditions deteriorated and the work of the volunteers became more demanding. The French government reduced the funds for the building materials and in March the prefect of Meuse forbade the mayor of Esnes from allocating work to the volunteers. The difficult political circumstances of that time when the negotiations concerning the German war reparations had just failed, were behind the prefect's decision. After this, the volunteers continued to help the farmers in the village and a neighbouring village put forward a new agricultural reconstruction project. Eventually, the local authorities demanded that the German volunteers would have to leave the area. The team finished its work in April 1921 and left Esnes-en-Argonne.

Workcamps from the 1920s onwards became a way of responding to global and local humanitarian and crisis situations. The biggest project took place, again organised by Cérésole and Service Civil International, in 1928 in Liechtenstein, where 720 volunteers from over 20 countries helped to reconstruct the country after a flood event. The experience in Liechtenstein and the enthusiasm of the volunteers became a model for future work camps, which from 1930 onwards were carried out in France, Great Britain and other countries.

Until the 1950s, the concept of workcamps was mainly spread within Europe and many projects were focused on the reconstruction of the continent after World War II. Service Civil International started branches in several countries, but also organisations like the Christian Movement for Peace (CMP) started adopting the concept of workcamps for example for post-war reconciliation between French and German Christians. Since the 1950s, workcamps have increasingly been organised also in Asia, Africa and Latin America, with a rise in projects especially since the 1990s.

In 1948, organisations from Western and Eastern Europe as well as the USA started the Coordinating Committee for International Work-Camps (CoCo), since 1965 Coordinating Committee for International Voluntary Service (CCIVS), at a workcamp conference organised at the UNESCO Headquarters in Paris. The organisation since then focuses on creating a stronger network between its member organisations and to have a stronger representation in international institutions.
