= Pierre Cérésole =

Swiss peace activist

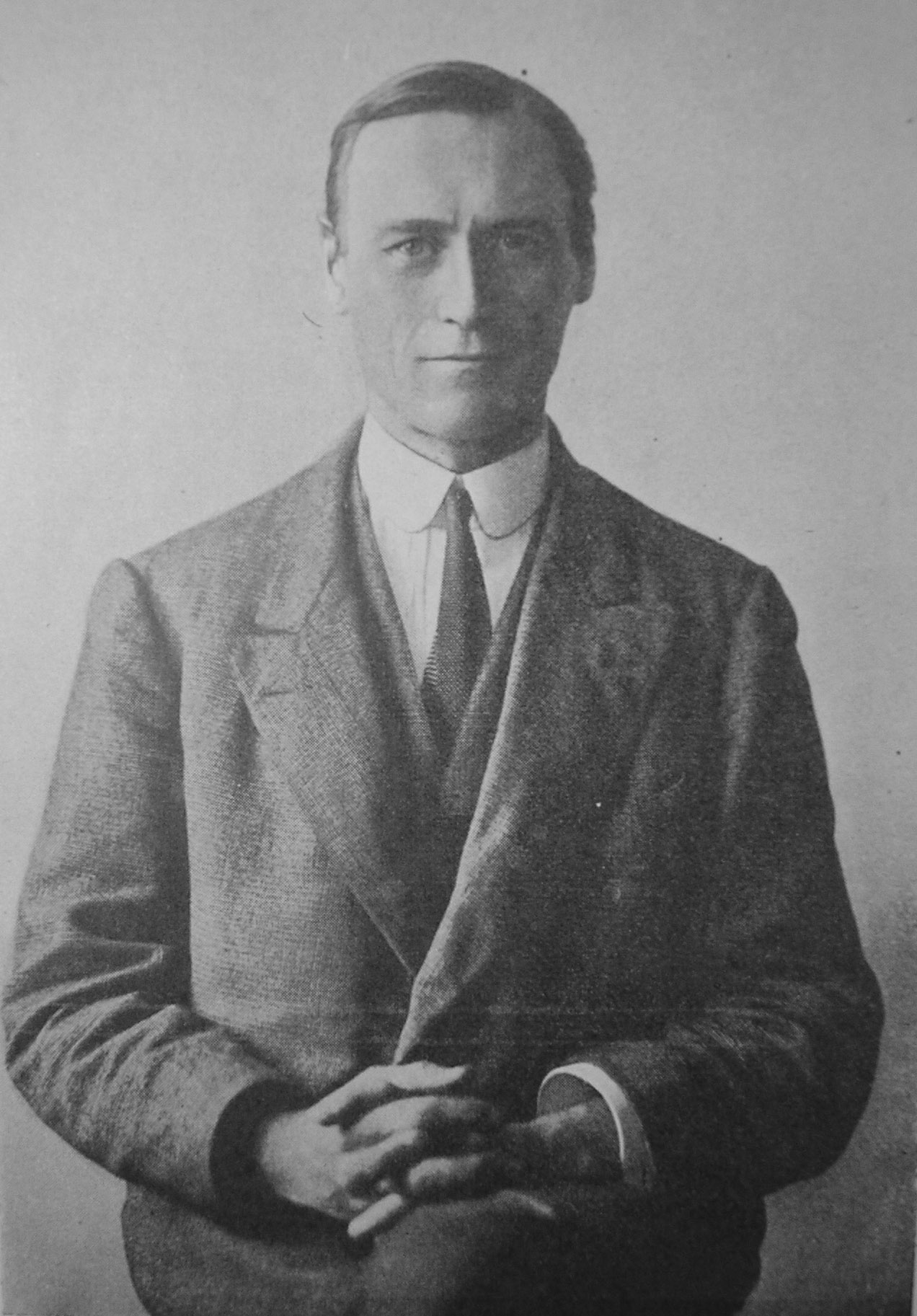
- Born: 17 August 1879; Lausanne, Switzerland
- Died: 23 October 1945 (aged 66); Lutry, Switzerland
- Occupations: Engineer, teacher, peace activist
- Known for: Founder of Service Civil International

Signature
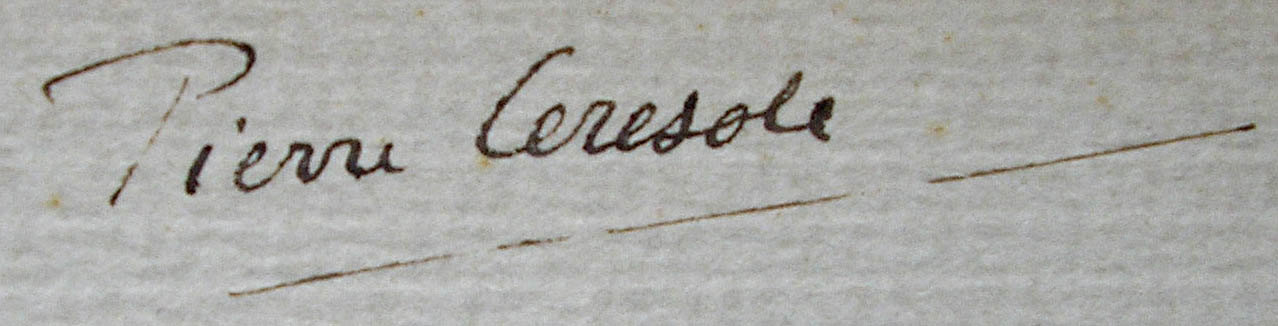

Pierre Cérésole or Ceresole (Note: The name has Italian origins and in French is generally written without accents, while accents are added in English or German texts.) (17 August 1879 – 23 October 1945) was a Swiss pacifist, remembered for founding the peace organisation Service Civil International (SCI) and the international workcamp movement.

== Life ==
Cérésole was born in Lausanne on 17 August 1879, ninth of the ten children of Emma (née Secretan) and Paul Cérésole. His father was a lawyer, member of the Swiss Federal Council and a President of the Swiss Confederation. His mother died when he was nine years old.

He studied engineering at ETH in Zurich, obtained a PhD and then pursued further studies in physics and mathematics in Germany. In 1909 he turned down the offer of a professorship at ETH and spent the next five years travelling in the United States, Hawaii and Japan, doing both manual and intellectual work.

Returning to Switzerland at the outbreak of World War I, Cérésole donated his inheritance to the Swiss state and worked as an engineer. He took up the pacifist cause, speaking at meetings and refusing to pay his military tax, for which he was sentenced to a day in prison.

In 1919 and 1920, Cérésole attended the Bilthoven Meetings in the Netherlands, which had been organised by the pacifist group, the Fellowship of Reconciliation. It was at the second of these meetings that Cérésole, inspired by the words of a German delegate, offered to put together a team to carry out practical reconstruction work. Cérésole, together with English Quaker Hubert Parris, organised a workcamp in the French village of Esnes-en-Argonne, which had been badly damaged during the Battle of Verdun. The team of volunteers, which set to work in November 1920, included three Germans, an Austrian and a Dutchman. A Dutchwoman covered the initial costs of the work and did the cooking and washing. They constructed two wooden houses and then, when the French government cancelled their contract, turned to clearing fields of debris, filling up shell-holes and repairing a road until, in April 1921, the French authorities asked them to leave. In spite of its premature end, the project had been of benefit to both the volunteers and the villagers, and Cérésole's enthusiasm for workcamps was undiminished.

Cérésole organised more workcamps during the 1920s with the help of his brother, colonel Ernest Cérésole. The newly founded organisation was called Service Civil International and sent volunteers to, for example, a Swiss village that had been damaged by a landslide, another village that had been damaged by an avalanche, and to Liechtenstein in the aftermath of floods. In 1924, Cérésole also started to promote international workcamps as a model service for conscientious objectors, in order to support a political campaign to introduce an alternative service in Switzerland, a proposal that was defeated in the Swiss parliament. In the 1920s and 1930s, Cérésole combined his work running SCI with teaching, first at the Quaker school in Gland and then at the grammar school in La Chaux-de-Fonds.

In 1931, Cérésole met Mahatma Gandhi in Lausanne, who was staying in Romain Rolland's house in Geneva after having taken part in the Round Table Conferences in London. Cérésole was inspired by Gandhi's thinking, but also disagreed with parts of his non-cooperation approach. While they agreed on refusing to support any military activity by any government, Cérésole was ready to cooperate with governments no matter their ideology on other grounds. Between 1934 and 1937 Cérésole worked with a team of three (SCI member Paul Schenker and two English Quakers) helping to rebuild villages in Bihar in northeastern India after the 1934 Nepal–India earthquake 1934 earthquake. In 1938 and 1939, Cérésole was nominated for the Nobel Peace Prize.

Cérésole lived in his native Switzerland during World War II continuing his work as secretary of SCI. On two occasions, as a protest against the war, he illegally attempted to cross the border into Germany, which landed him in prison for several weeks. In 1941 he married Lise David. He died in Lutry on 23 October 1945. After Cérésole's death, his friend and peace activist, Hélène Monastier, published his biography and a collection of his correspondence.

== Bibliography ==
- Cérésole, Pierre (1950). Vivre sa vérité Carnets de route 1909-1944. Neuchâtel: La Baconnière. p. 279 p.
- Cérésole, Pierre (1954). For peace and truth: from the note-books of Pierre Ceresole. Translated by John W. Harvey; Christina Yates. Bannisdale Press. p. 192 p.
- Monastier, Hélène (1947). Un Quaker d'aujourd'hui: Pierre Cérésole. Paris. p. 43 p.
- Monastier, Hélène (1960). Pierre Cérésole d'après sa correspondance. Neuchâtel: La Baconnière. p. 249 p.
- Maddock, Keith (2005). Living truth: a spiritual portrait of Pierre Ceresole. Pendle Hill pamphlets #379. Wallingford: Pendle Hill. p. 35 p. ISSN 0031-4250.

== See also ==
- List of peace activists
