= GYB =

GYB may refer to:

- Garus language, spoken in Papua New Guinea
- Giddings–Lee County Airport, in Texas, United States
- Gymnase intercantonal de la Broye, a secondary school in Payerne, Switzerland
