= Half tower =

Architectural feature

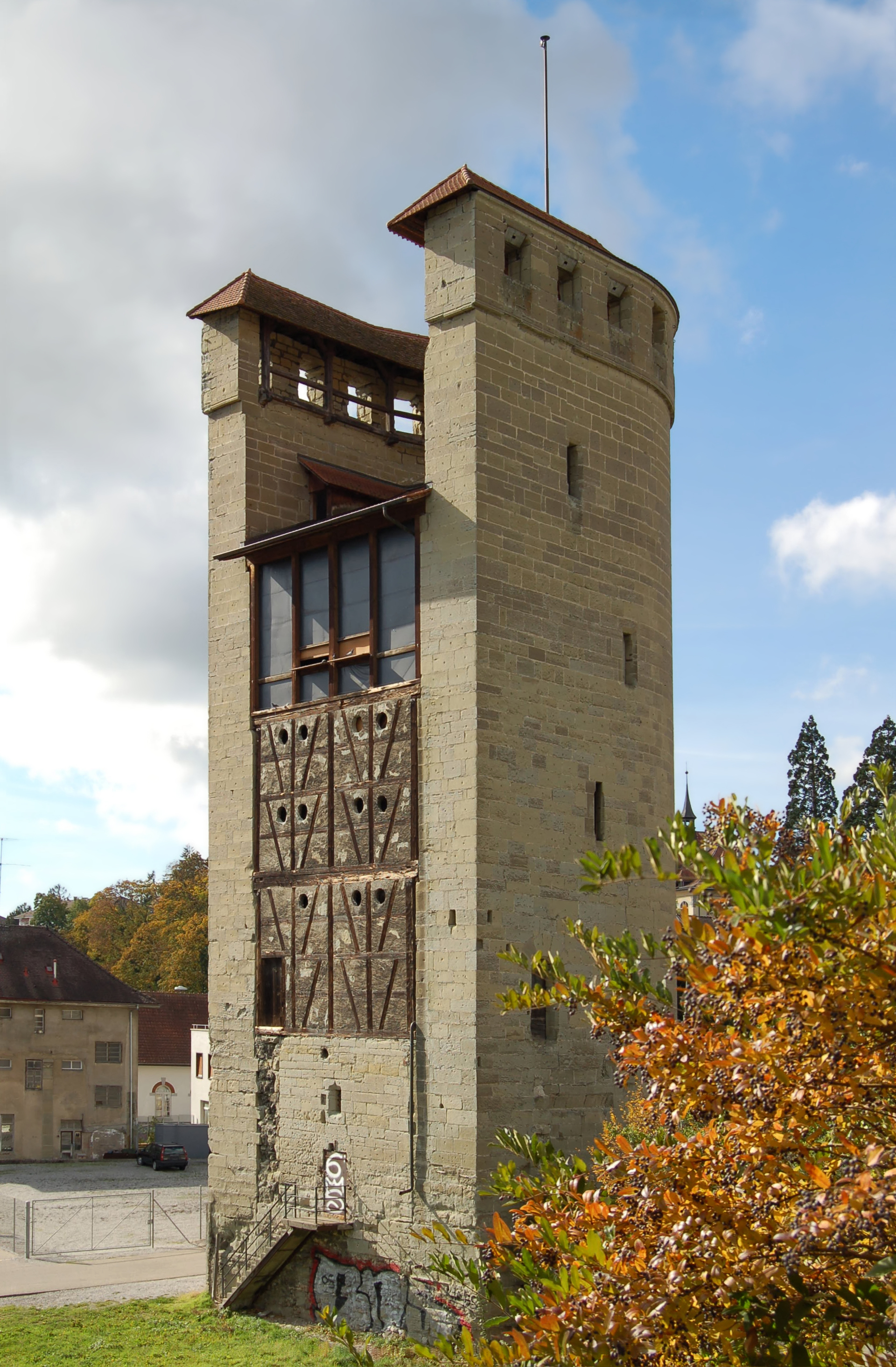
Half tower in the town walls of Freiburg im Üechtland

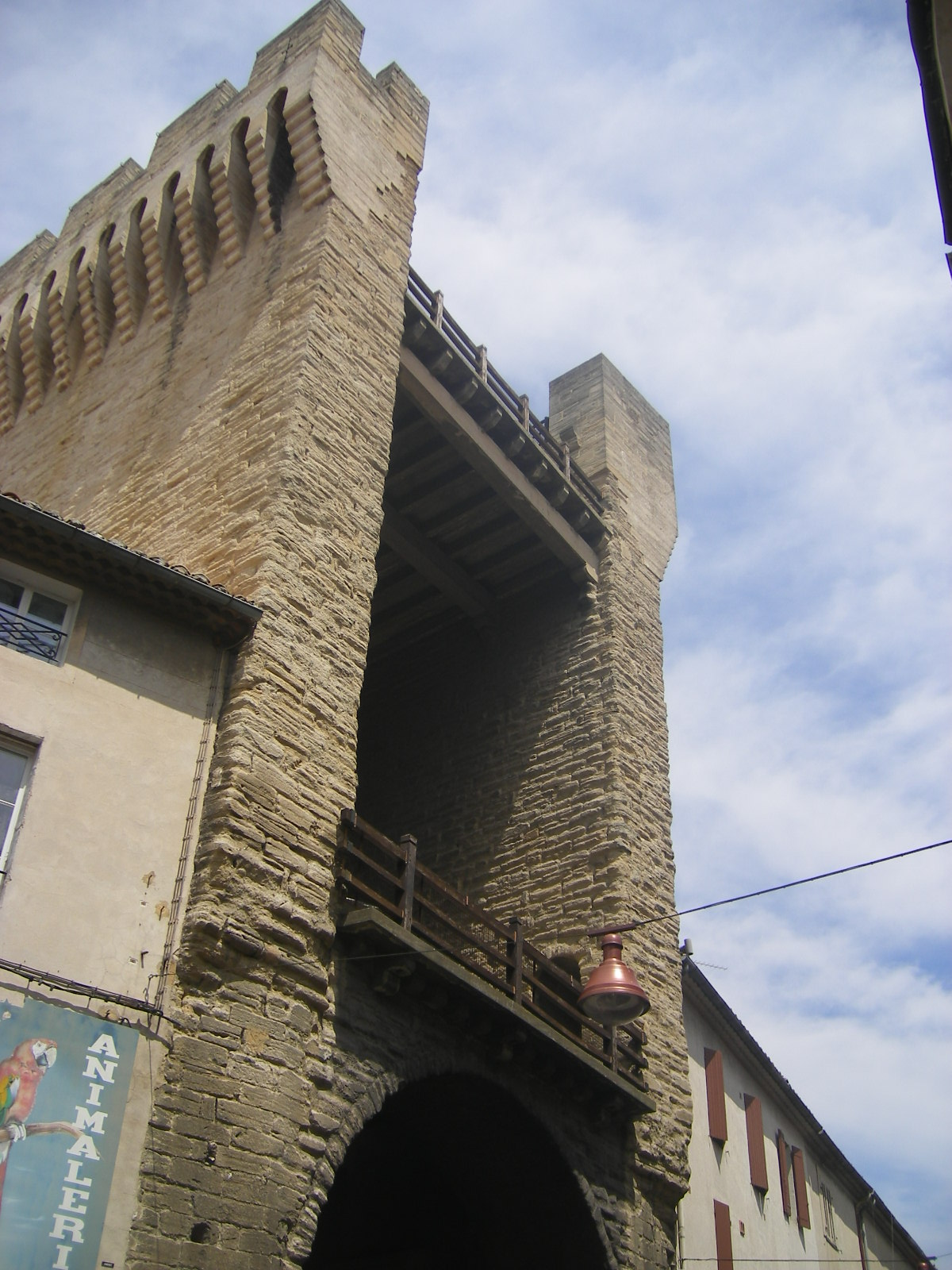
The Porte d'Orange in Carpentras, a town gate built as a half tower

A half tower (sometimes half-tower), open tower, open-backed tower or open-gorged tower (German: Schalenturm, Halbschalenturm or Schanzturm) is a fortified stone tower in an external wall or castle enceinte that is open, or only lightly constructed, at the rear.

== Description ==
Unlike closed towers, which were fully enclosed by walls, half towers were open on the inside, typically the side facing the city or the inner bailey of a castle. On this side, a wooden railing on individual floors stopped people or objects from falling off. Sometimes the open side was sealed with wooden planking or weaker timber framed walls. Towers that are fully open at the top and rear are open towers, whilst those only open on the lower floors (i.e., the top floor is walled and roofed) are partially open towers.

Most half towers were semi-circular in plan, but some were rectangular.

== Examples ==
Semi-circular half towers

- Bergerschanzturm in Aachen, Germany
- Endingerturm in Rapperswil, Switzerland
- Haldenturm in Rapperswil
- Karlsturm in Aachen
- Schildturm in Aachen
- Dover Castle, Kent, England
- Wehrturm am Gänsbühl in Ravensburg, Germany

City or town wall towers

- Conwy, Wales
- Dinkelsbühl, Germany
- Bad Hersfeld, Germany
- Einbeck, Germany
- Freiburg im Üechtland, Switzerland
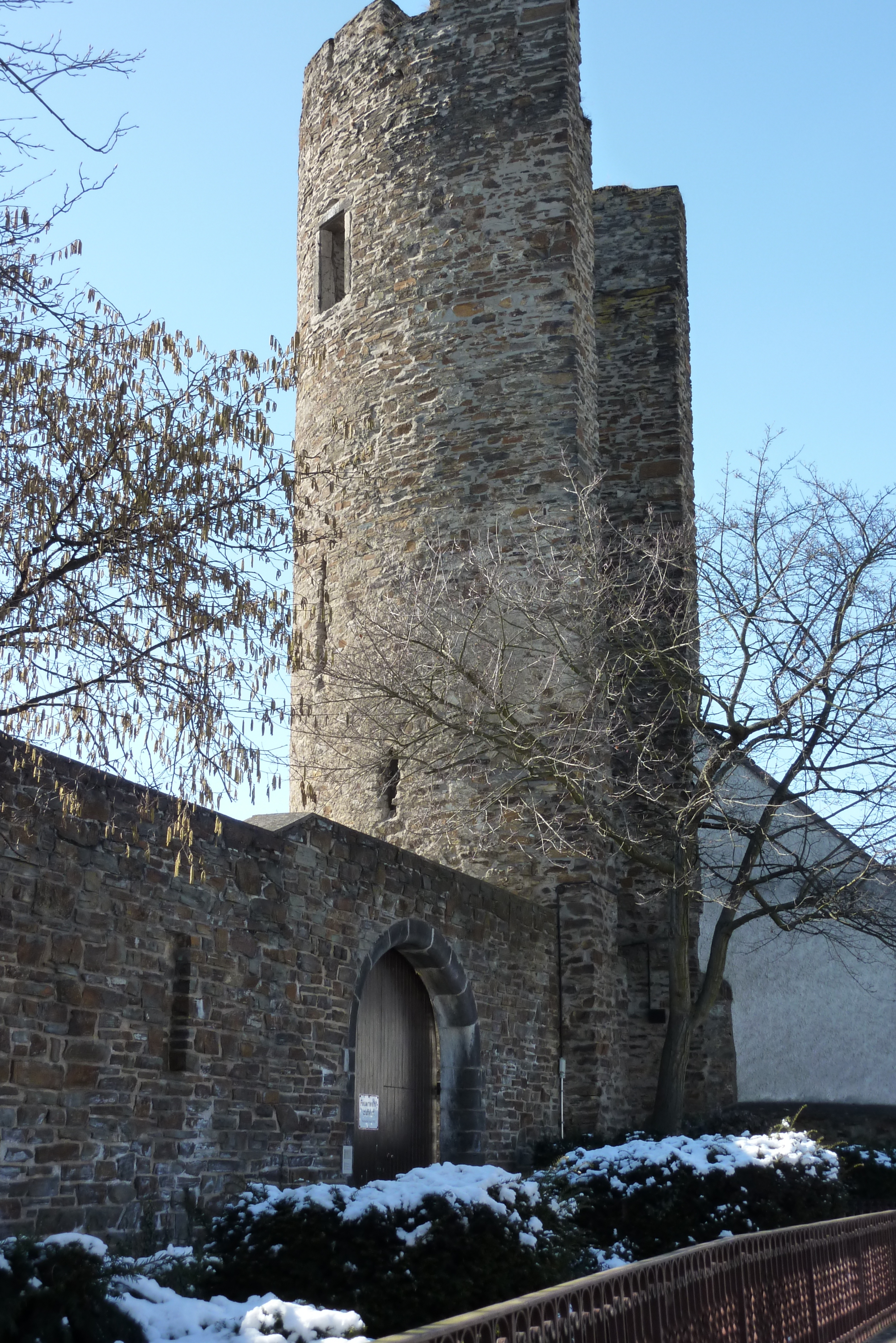
Bitzenturm, Ahrweiler

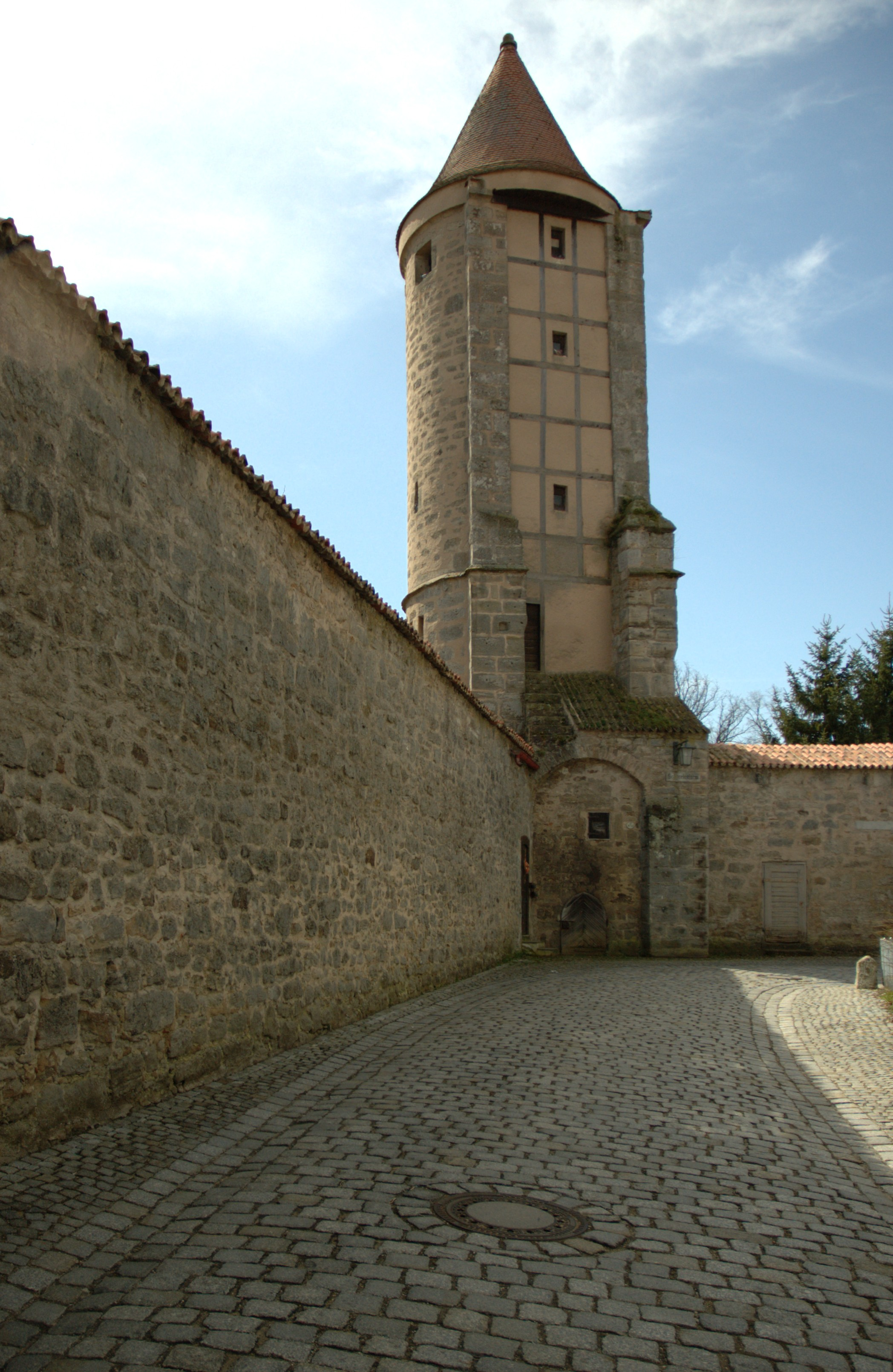
Dinkelsbühl

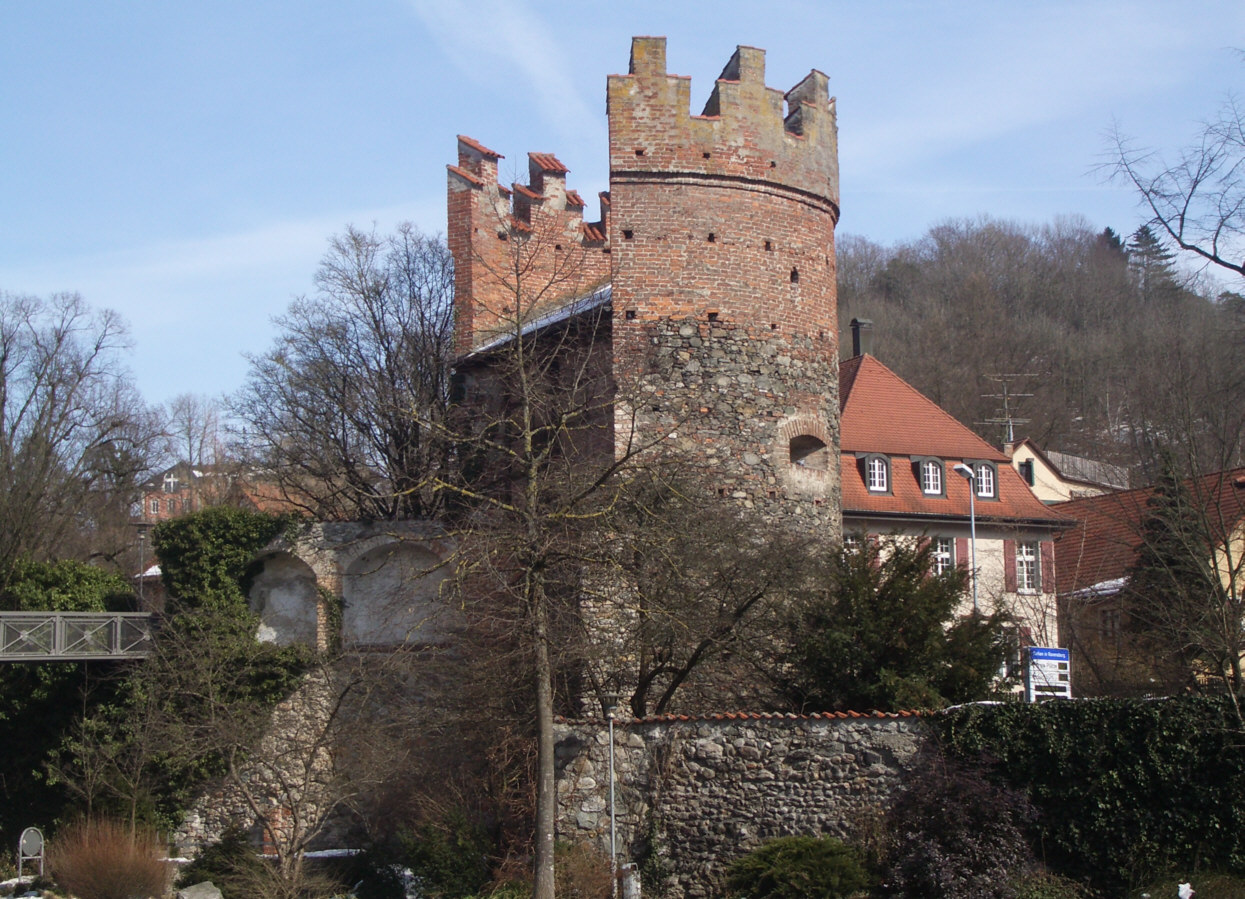
Ravensburg

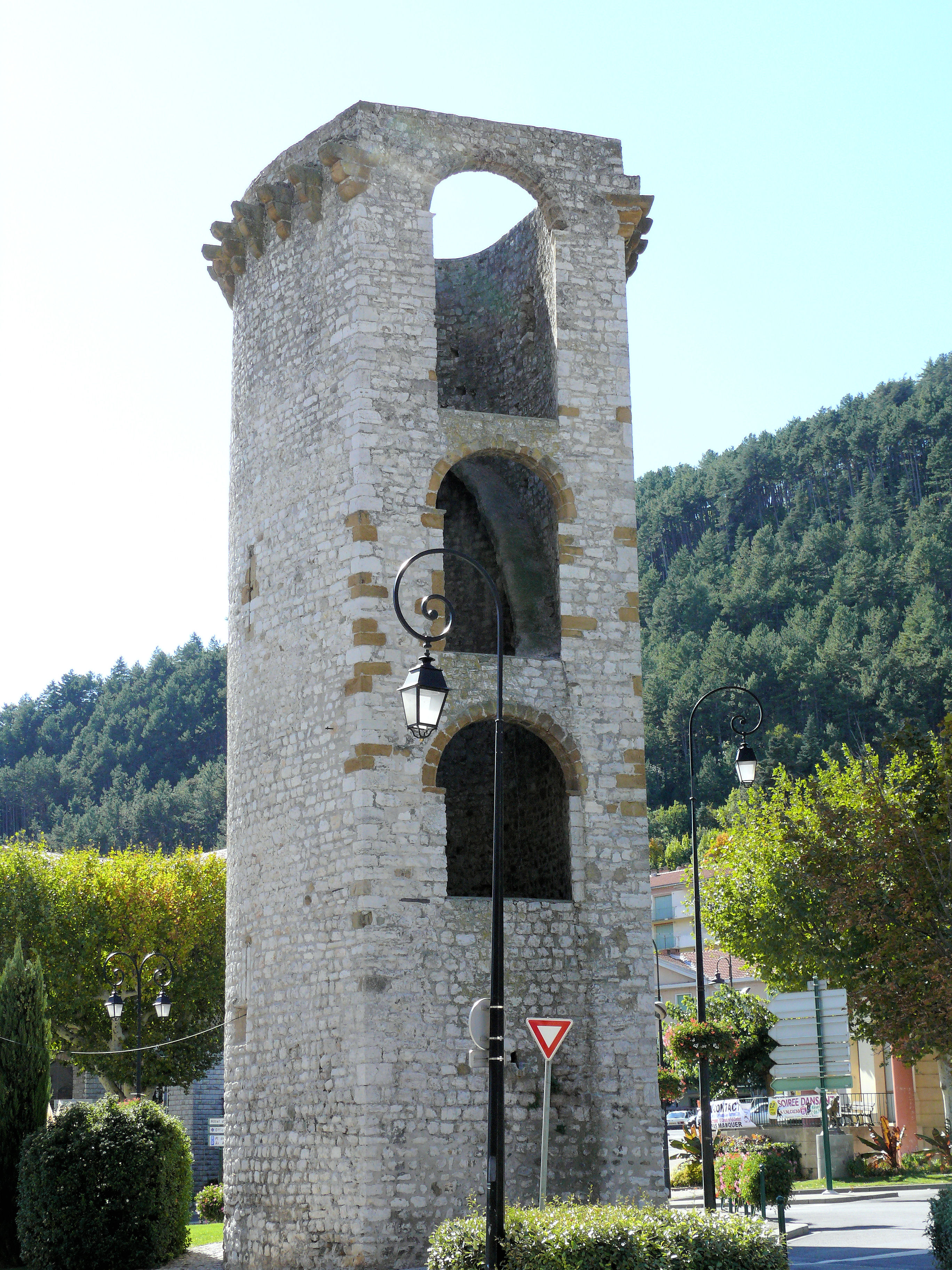
Sisteron (South France)

Rectangular half towers

- Framlingham Castle, Suffolk, England
- Krichelenturm in Aachen
- Schänzchen in Aachen
- Porte d'Orange in Carpentras, France

Town wall towers in

- Payerne, Switzerland
- Ston, Croatia
- Głogów, Poland
- Avignon, France
- Aigues-Mortes, France
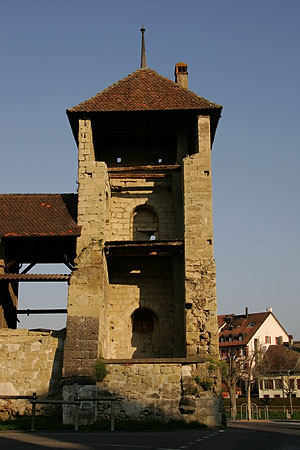
Payerne

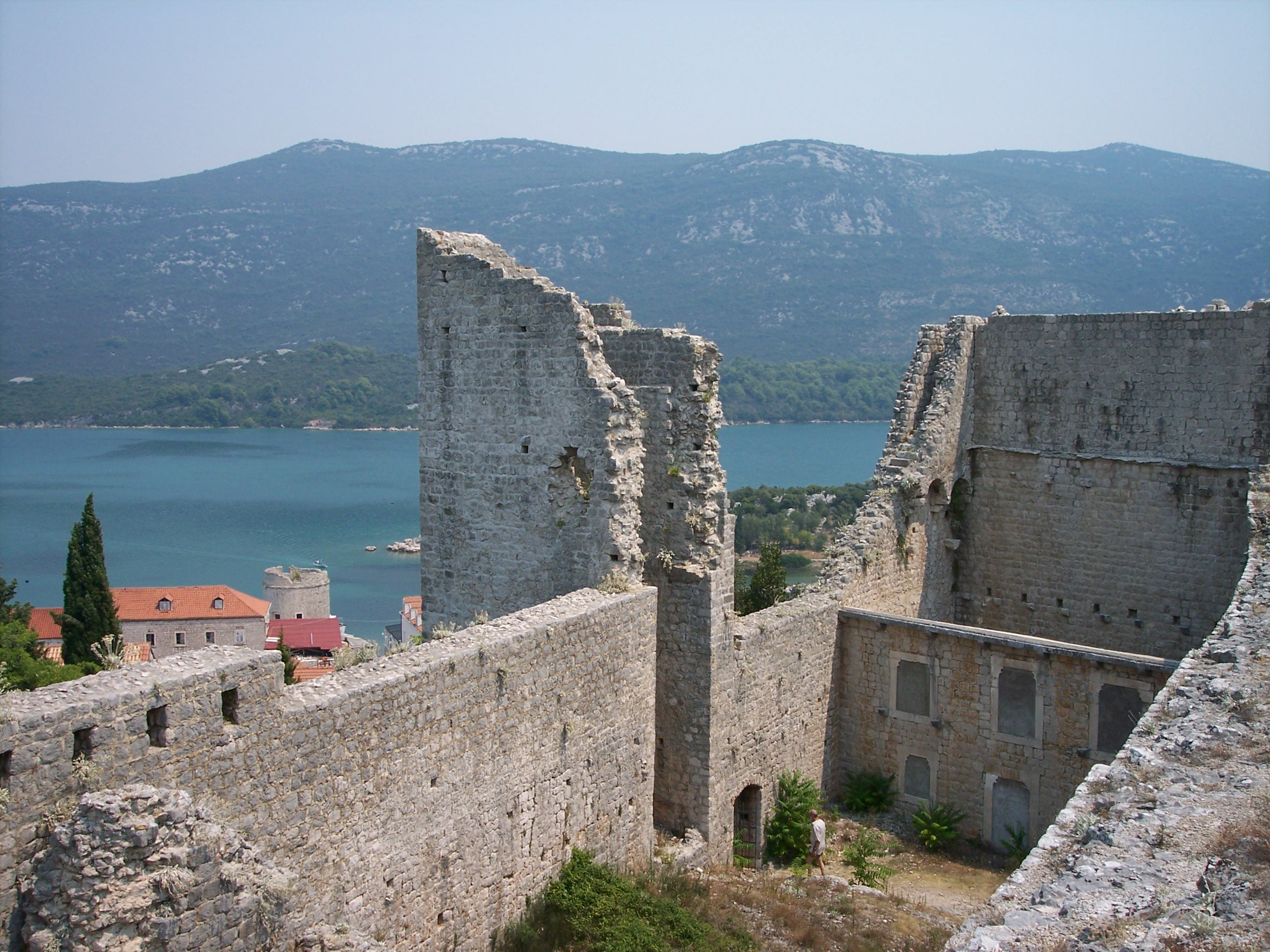
Ston

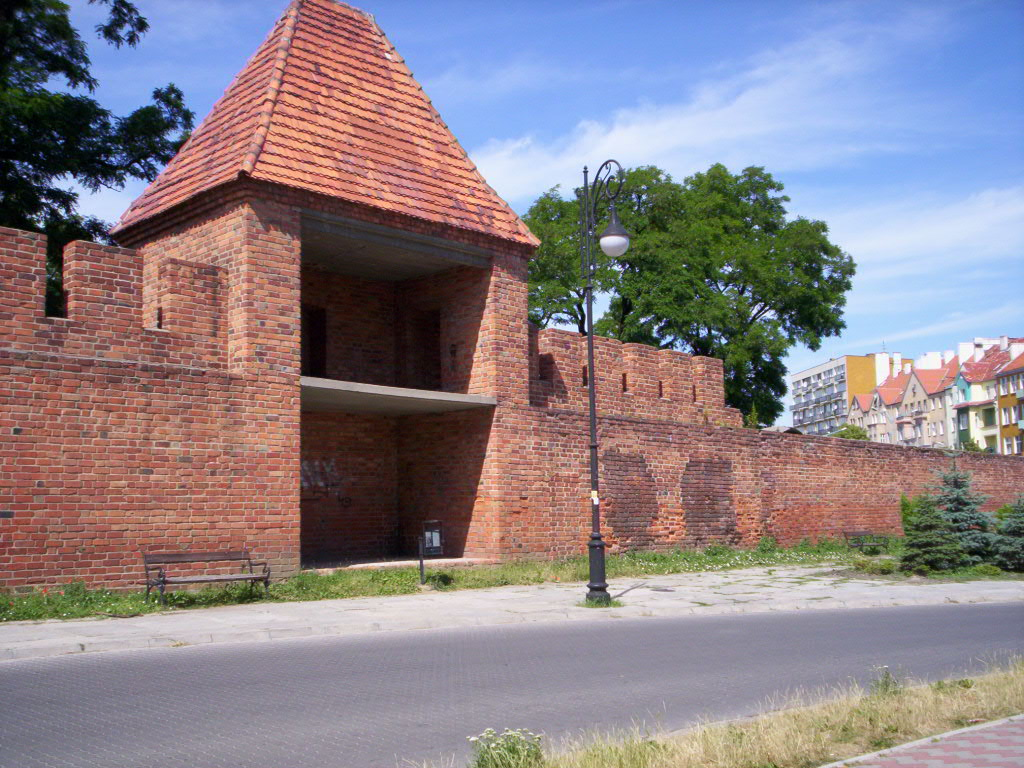
Głogów

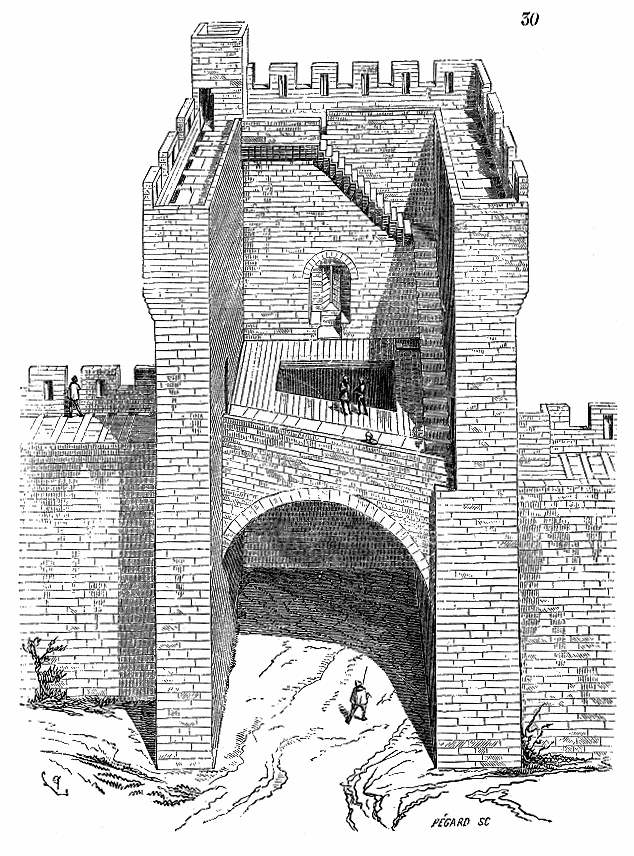
Avignon

== Literature ==
- Carl Rhoen (1894), Die Befestigungswerke der freien Reichsstadt Aachen (in German), Aachen: Verlag von Anton Creutzer, pp. 18f (Online version, pdf, 6.61MB)
