= Aimée Rapin =

Swiss artist (1868-1956)

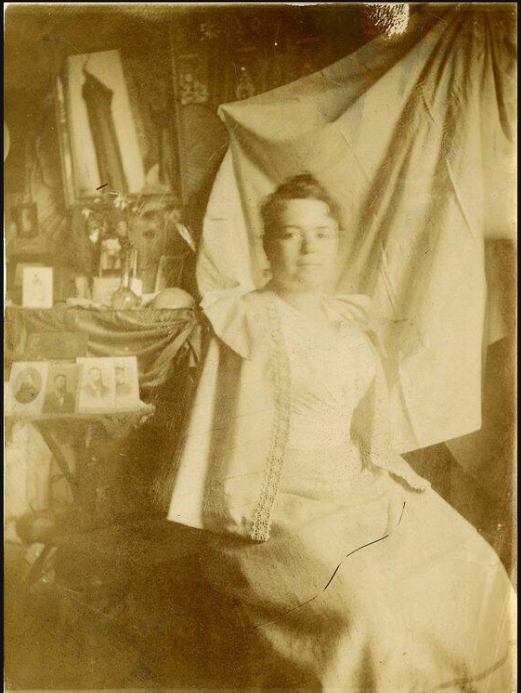
- Rapin c. 1920
- Born: February 14, 1868; Payerne, Switzerland
- Died: May 8, 1956 (aged 88); Geneva, Switzerland
- Known for: Portraiture
- Spouse: Stéphan Elmas (unmarried)

Aimée Rapin (February 14, 1868 —May 8, 1956) was a Swiss artist. She was born without arms and is notable for painting with her feet. Rapin took her first painting lessons in Lausanne, continuing her passion in art school in Geneva. During her artistic career, Rapin painted around 3,000 works of art, mainly portraits, and was celebrated as a disabled artist. She had a romantic relationship with Armenian composer Stéphan Elmas, who was partially deaf.

== Early life ==
Rapin was born in Payerne, Switzerland on February 14, 1868 to a wealthy family. Her father, Jules Rapin, was an artist and musician. She was born without arms, the only one of her 12 siblings to be disabled. Among her brothers was the Swiss activist Oscar Rapin.

In 1872, her family moved to Lausanne. There, Rapin began taking her first painting lessons with M. Meyenbourg. Aimée learned to use her feet instead of her hands for everything, from daily tasks like eating to her new hobby of painting. The family later moved back to Payerne, but Rapin did not stop painting.

Rapin later moved back to Lausanne on her own for boarding school at 14 and resumed her lessons with Meyenbourg. In 1884, she moved to Geneva and entered art school. She studied under Henri Héber, Huges Bovy, and Elisée Mayor learning topics like ceramics, sculpture, and painting.

== Artistic career ==
Rapin paints using her feet to hold her paintbrushes. It is estimated that she produced around 3,000 works of art in her lifetime, mainly portraits. Most of her work is kept today in the Musée de Payerne.

Selected works by Rapin

Portrait of Marie Louise Debogis

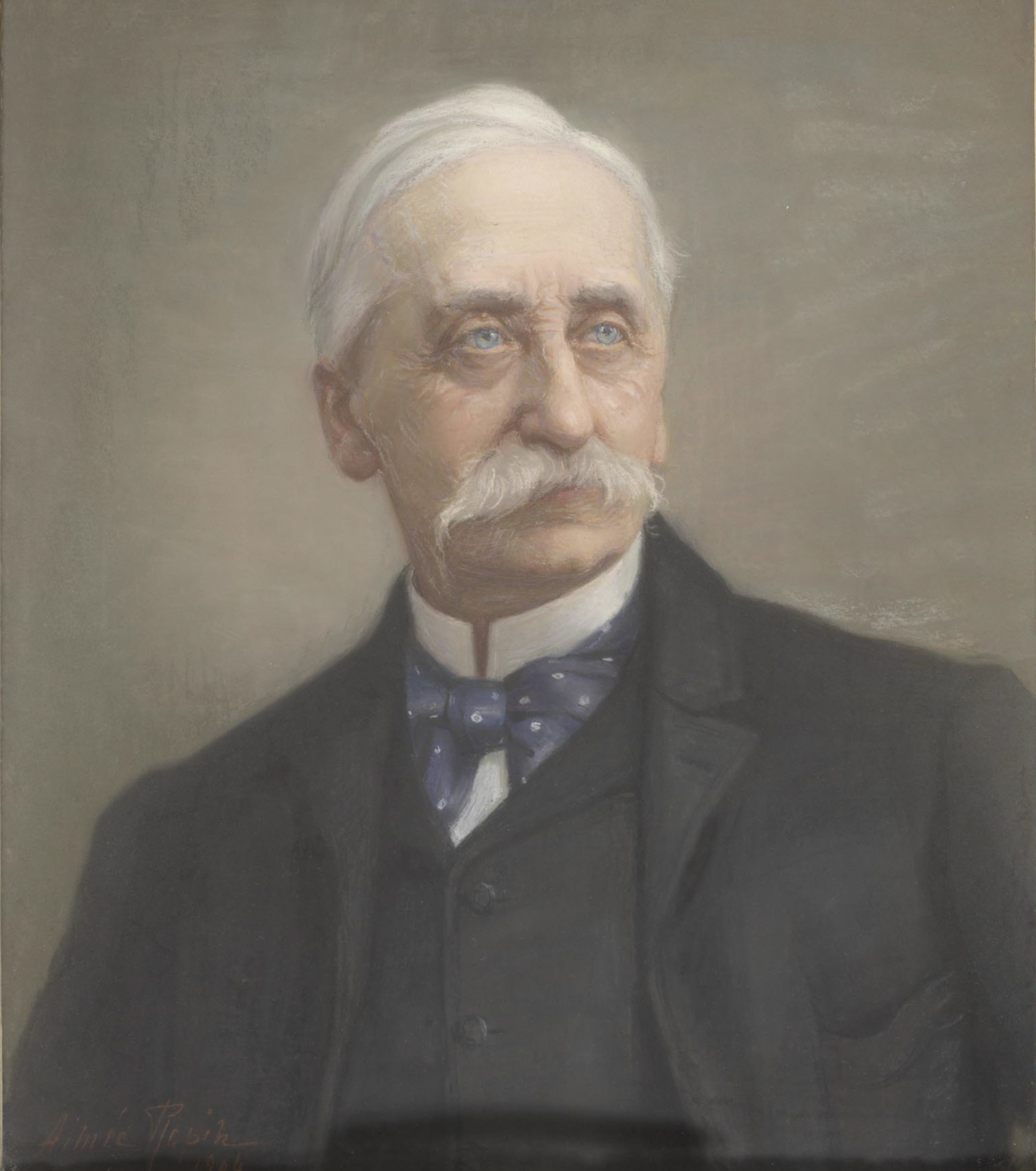
Portrait of Théodore de Saussure (1824-1903)

Genevese Watchmaker, 1904

Unknown portrait, 1896

The tomb of Aimée Rapin and Stéphan Elmas at the Cimetière des Rois.

== Personal life ==
In 1911, Rapin met and began a romantic relationship with Armenian composer Stéphan Elmas, who was partially deaf. Her relationship with Elmas inspired her to create her painting Armenia the Martyr after the Armenian genocide.

In order to cover her shoulders, Rapin would wear pelerines.

== Later life and legacy ==
Rapin died on May 8, 1956 in Geneva. She was buried in Plainpalais, at Cimetière des Rois, next to her lifelong partner Elmas.

Rapin has been celebrated for being a disabled artist, although historians have noted her success was likely due in part to her rich upbringing and family support. The Musée de Payerne held an exhibit on Rapin in 2006.
