= Fortified tower =

Defensive structure used in fortifications

The Tour du Tréseau, Carcassonne.

A fortified tower (also defensive tower or castle tower or, in context, just tower) is one of the defensive structures used in fortifications, such as castles, along with defensive walls such as curtain walls. Castle towers can have a variety of different shapes and fulfil different functions.

== Shape of towers ==
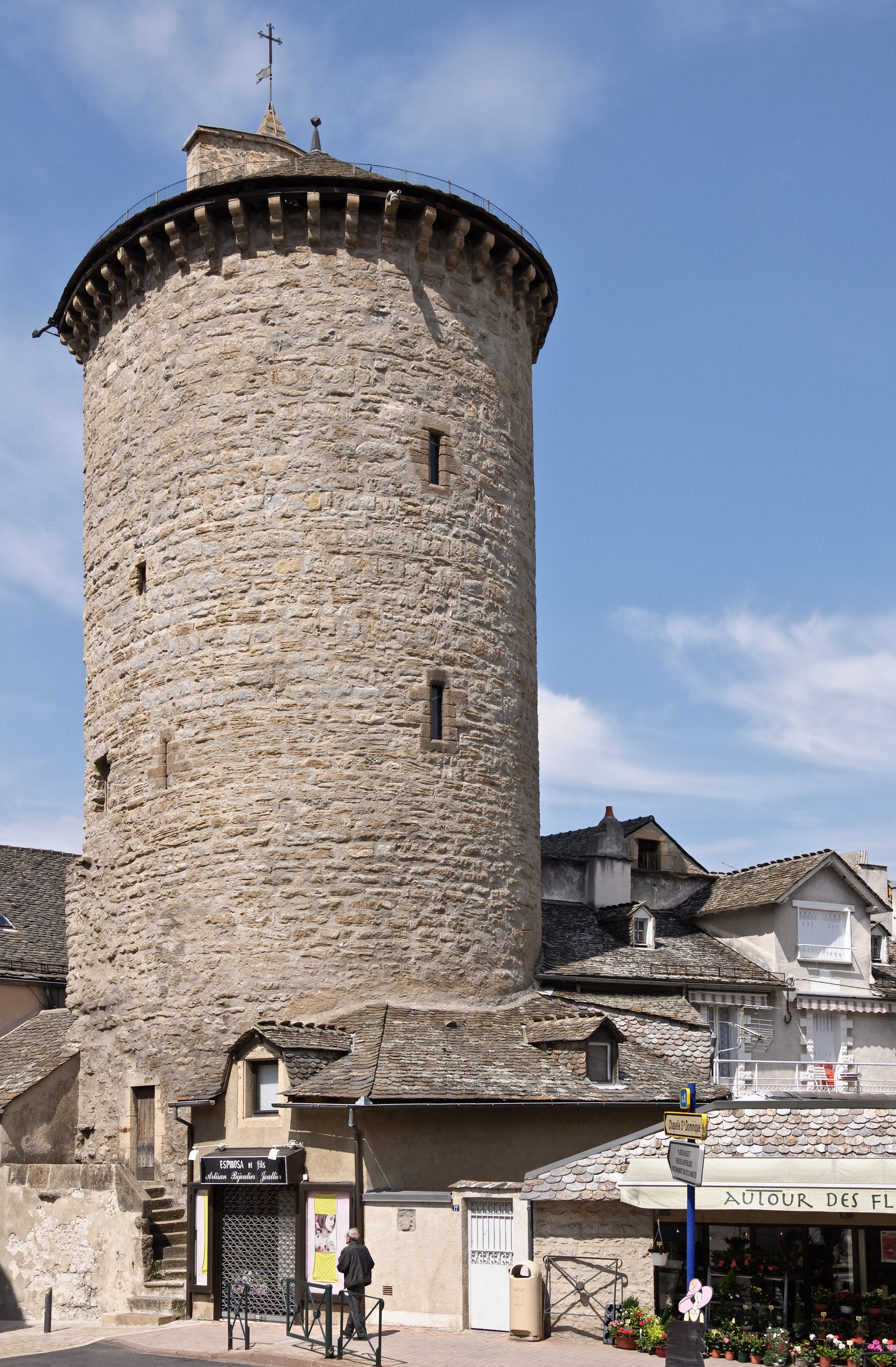
The Tour des Pénitents in Mende, France, a horseshoe-shaped tower remaining from the former medieval city walls

=== Rectangular towers ===
Square or rectangular towers are easy to construct and give a good amount of usable internal space. Their disadvantage is that the corners are vulnerable to mining. Despite this vulnerability, rectangular towers continued to be used, and Muslim military architecture generally favoured them.

=== Round towers ===
Round towers, also called drum towers, are more resistant to siege technology such as sappers and projectiles than square towers. The round front is more resistant than the straight side of a square tower, just as a load-bearing arch. This principle was already understood in antiquity.

=== Horseshoe-shaped towers ===
The horseshoe-shaped (or D-shaped) tower is a compromise that gives the best of a round and a square tower. The semicircular side (the one facing the attacker) could resist siege engines, while the rectangular part at the back gives internal space and a large fighting platform on top. The large towers at Krak des Chevaliers and the gate towers at Harlech Castle are good examples. Armenian castles such as Lampron also favoured this style.

=== Polygonal towers ===
A common form is an octagonal tower, used in some bergfrieds and at Castel del Monte in Italy.

There are also hybrid shapes. For instance, the keep at Château Gaillard is slightly bent forward, but also has a triangular beak to deflect projectiles.

== Towers with specific functions ==
Wall towers, also known as mural towers, provide flanking fire (from crossbows or other projectile weapons) to a straight part of the curtain wall. Corner towers enfilade the two adjoining wall faces. If corner towers are far apart, additional flanking towers may be added between them. Towers in an outer curtain wall are often open at the back.

Particularly large towers are often the strongest point of the castle: the keep or the bergfried. As the gate is always a vulnerable point of a castle, towers may be built near it to strengthen the defences at this point. In crusader castles, there is often a single gate tower, with the gate passage leading through the base of the tower itself. In European castles, it is more common to have flanking towers on either side of the entrance.

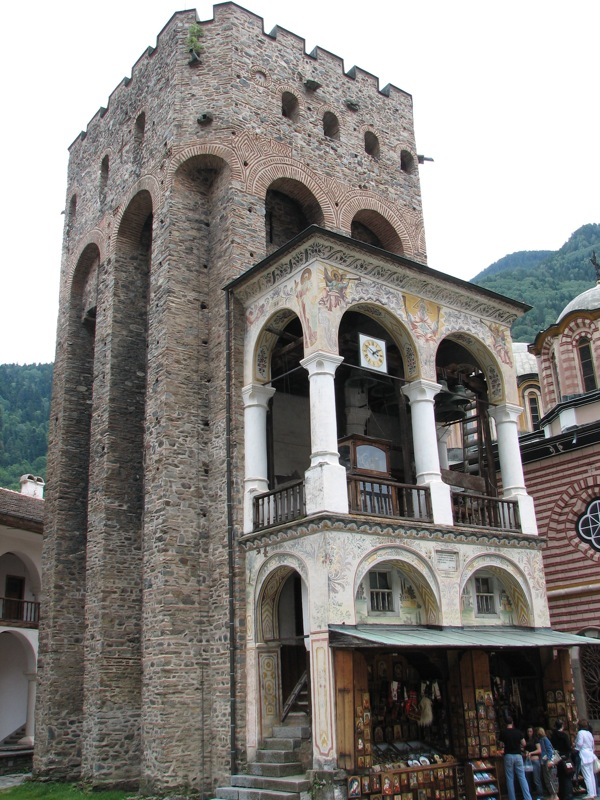
Tower of Hrelyu in the Rila Monastery, Bulgaria.

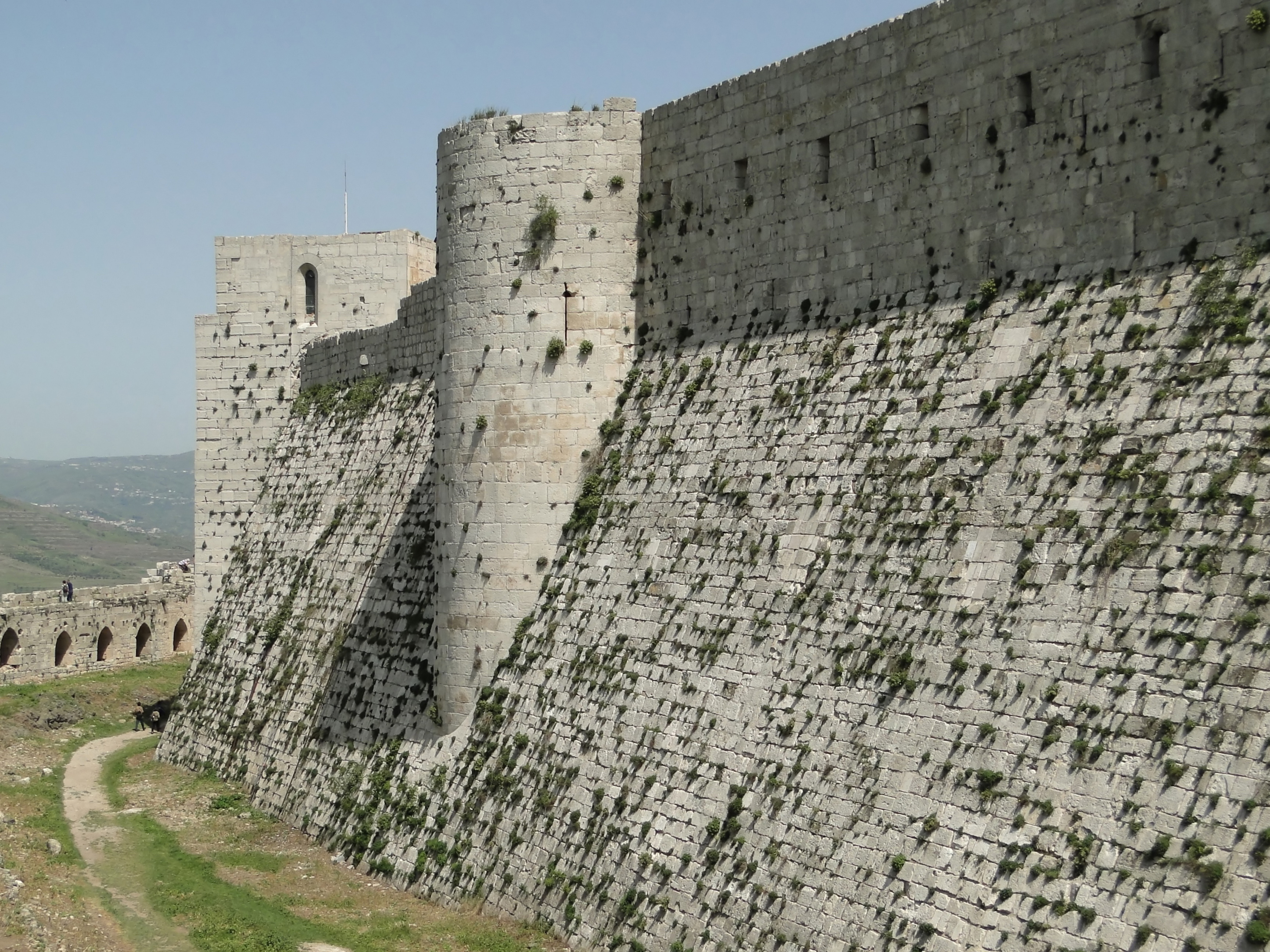
A rectangular and a round tower projecting from the wall at Krak des Chevaliers.

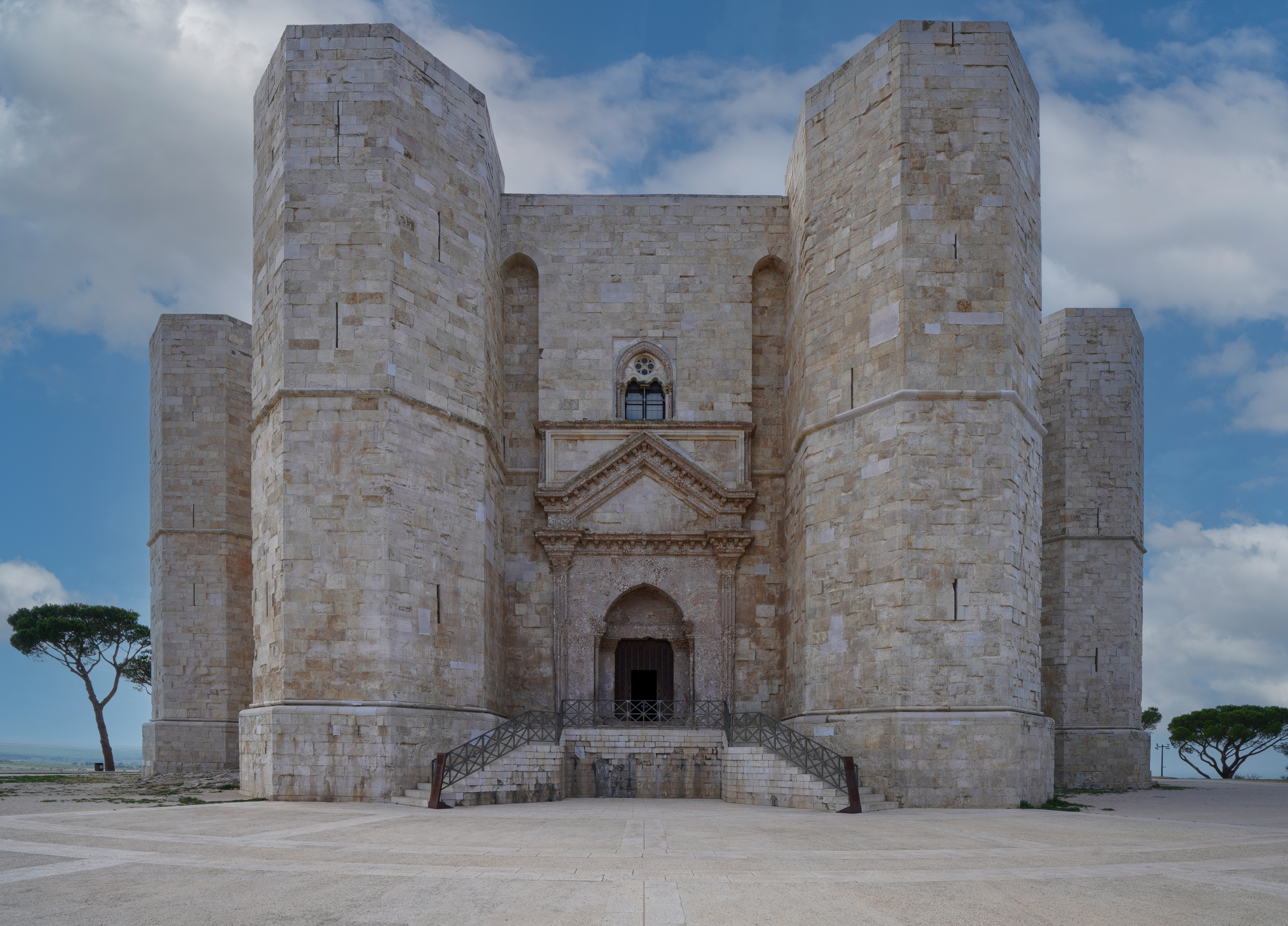
Octagonal corner towers at Castel del Monte, Apulia.

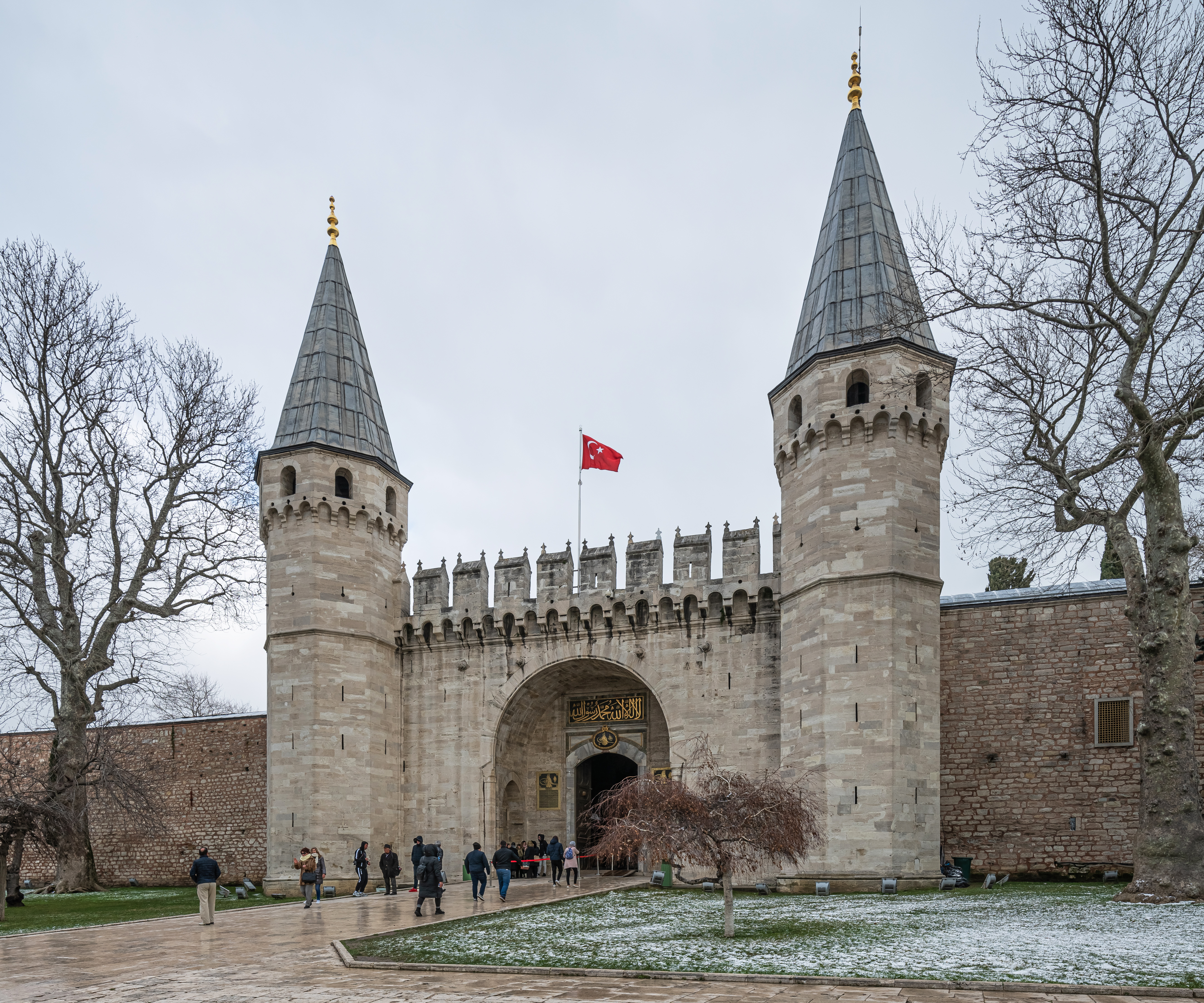
Towers of the Topkapı Palace's gate.

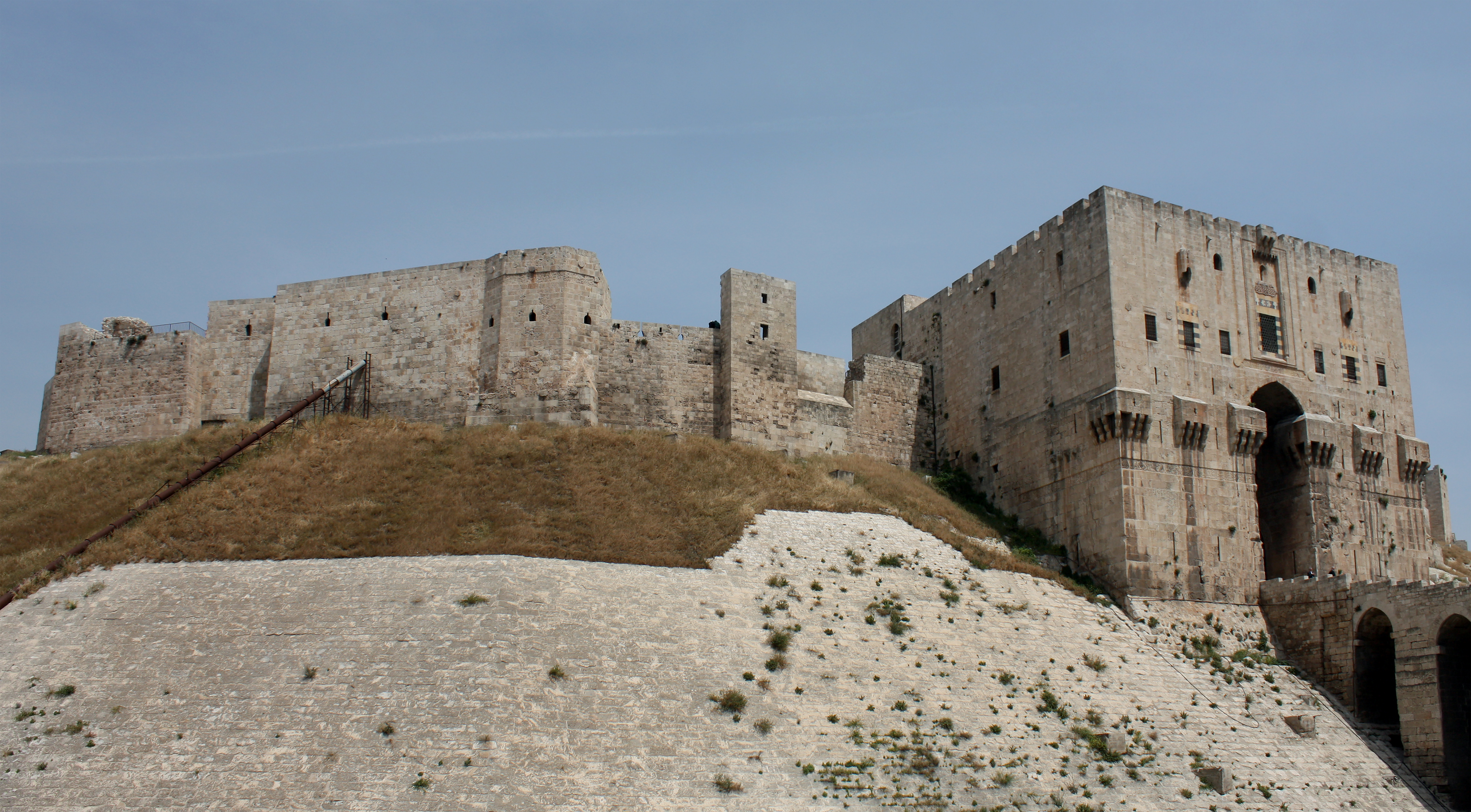
Wall towers and square gate tower at the Citadel of Aleppo.

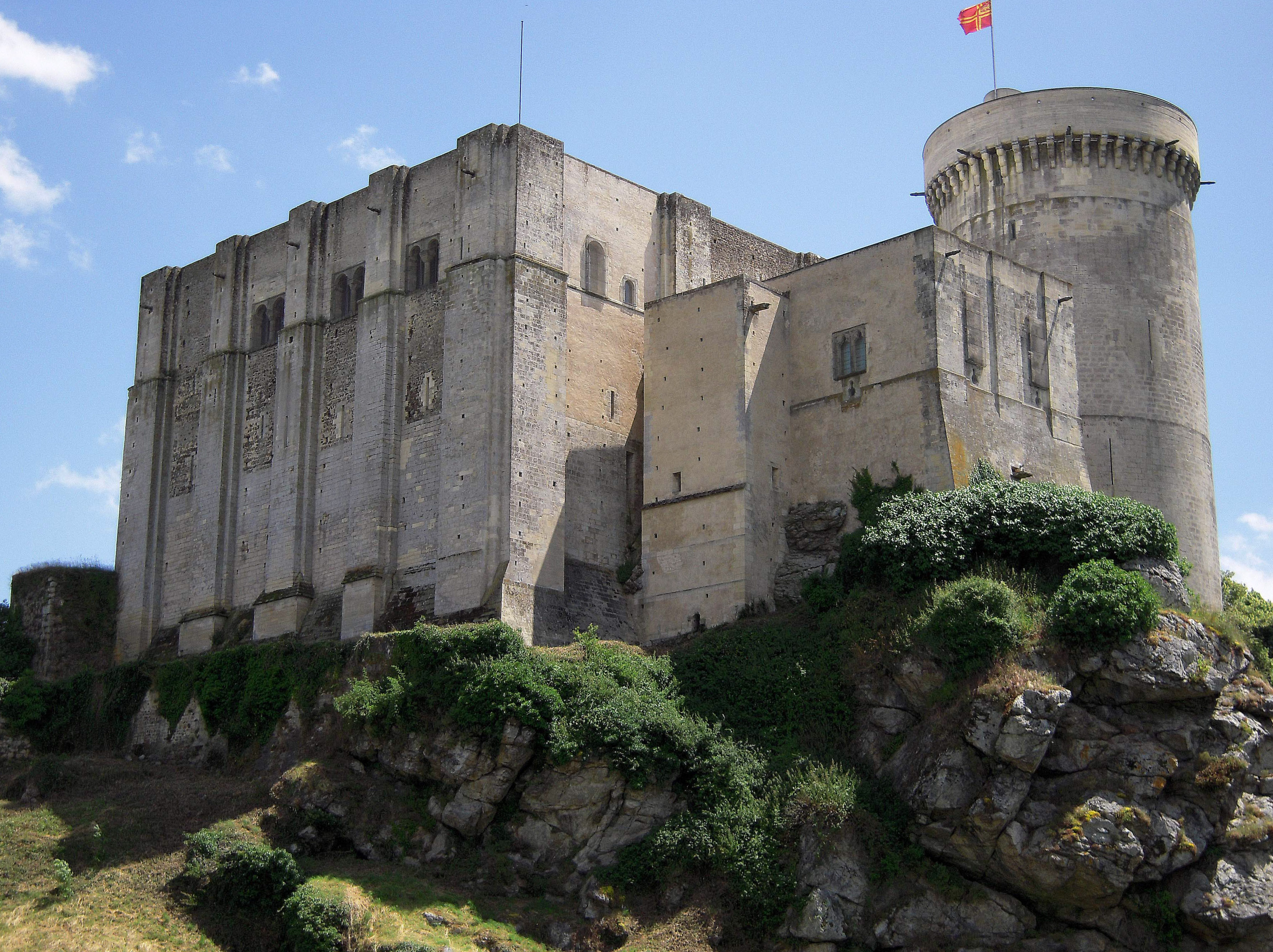
Rectangular keep and round tower at Château de Falaise.

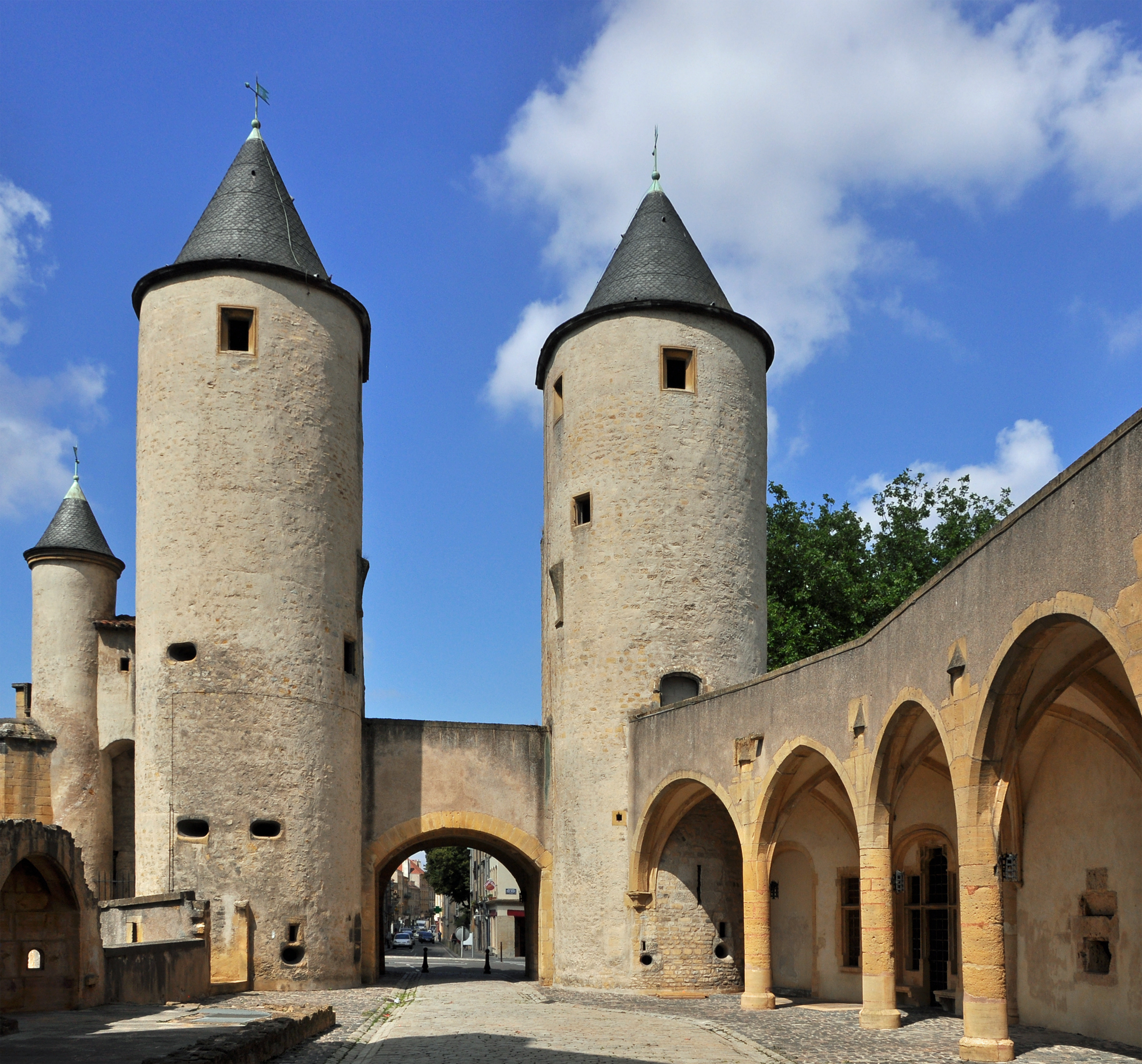
Twin towers at the German's Gate, bridge castle in Metz.

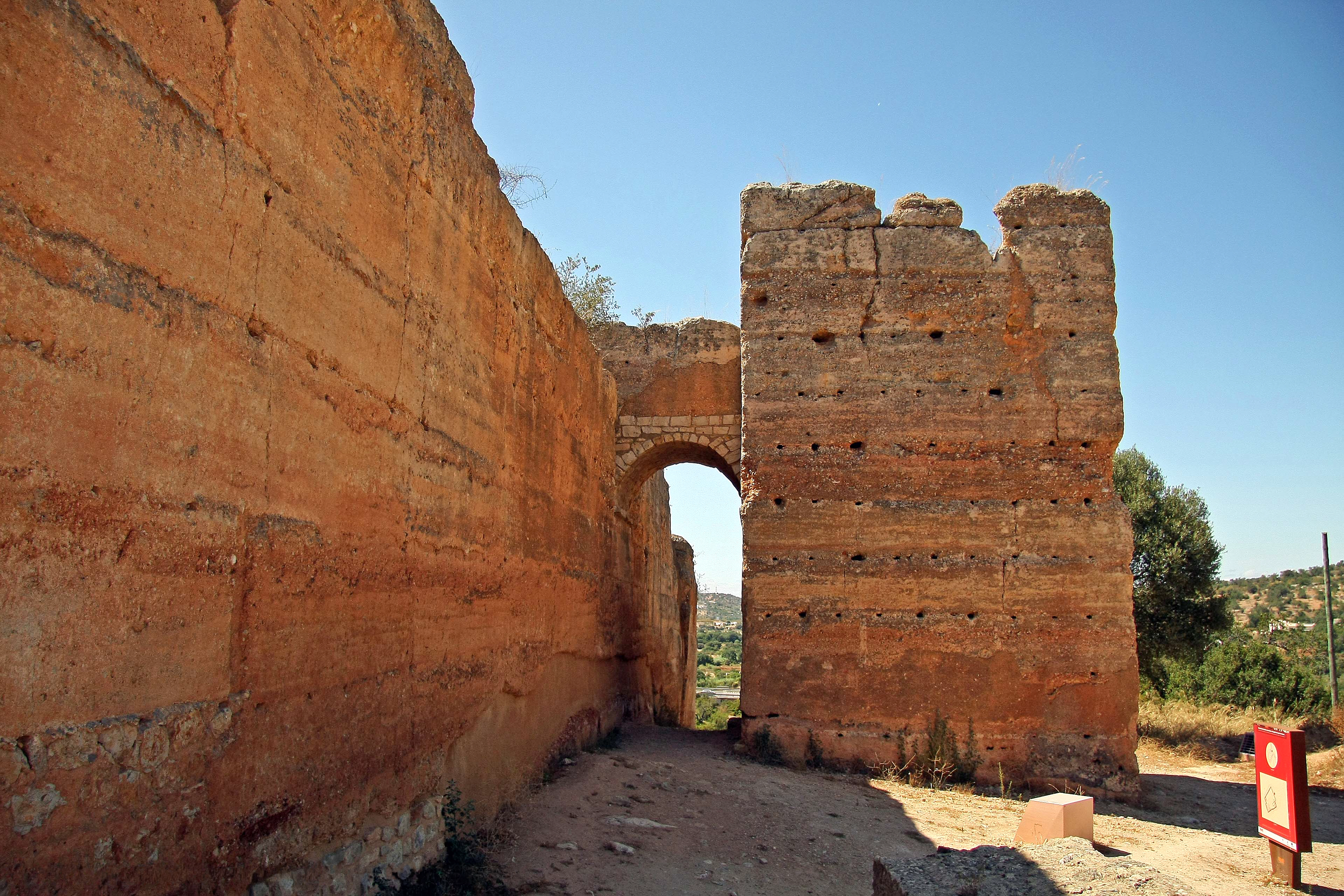
Albarrana tower in Castle of Paderne (Portugal)

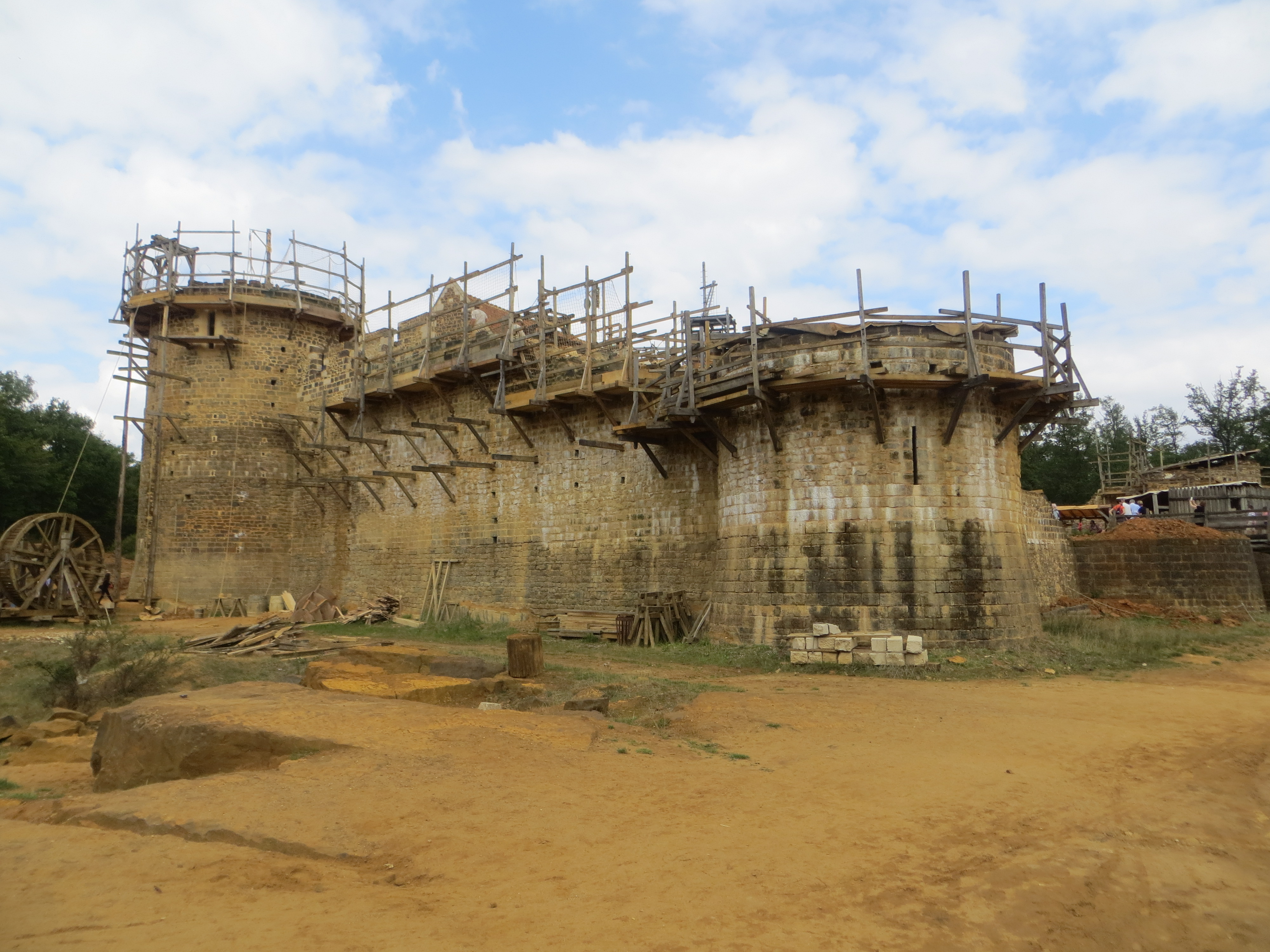
Guédelon Castle, experimental archaeology building medieval tower (2015)

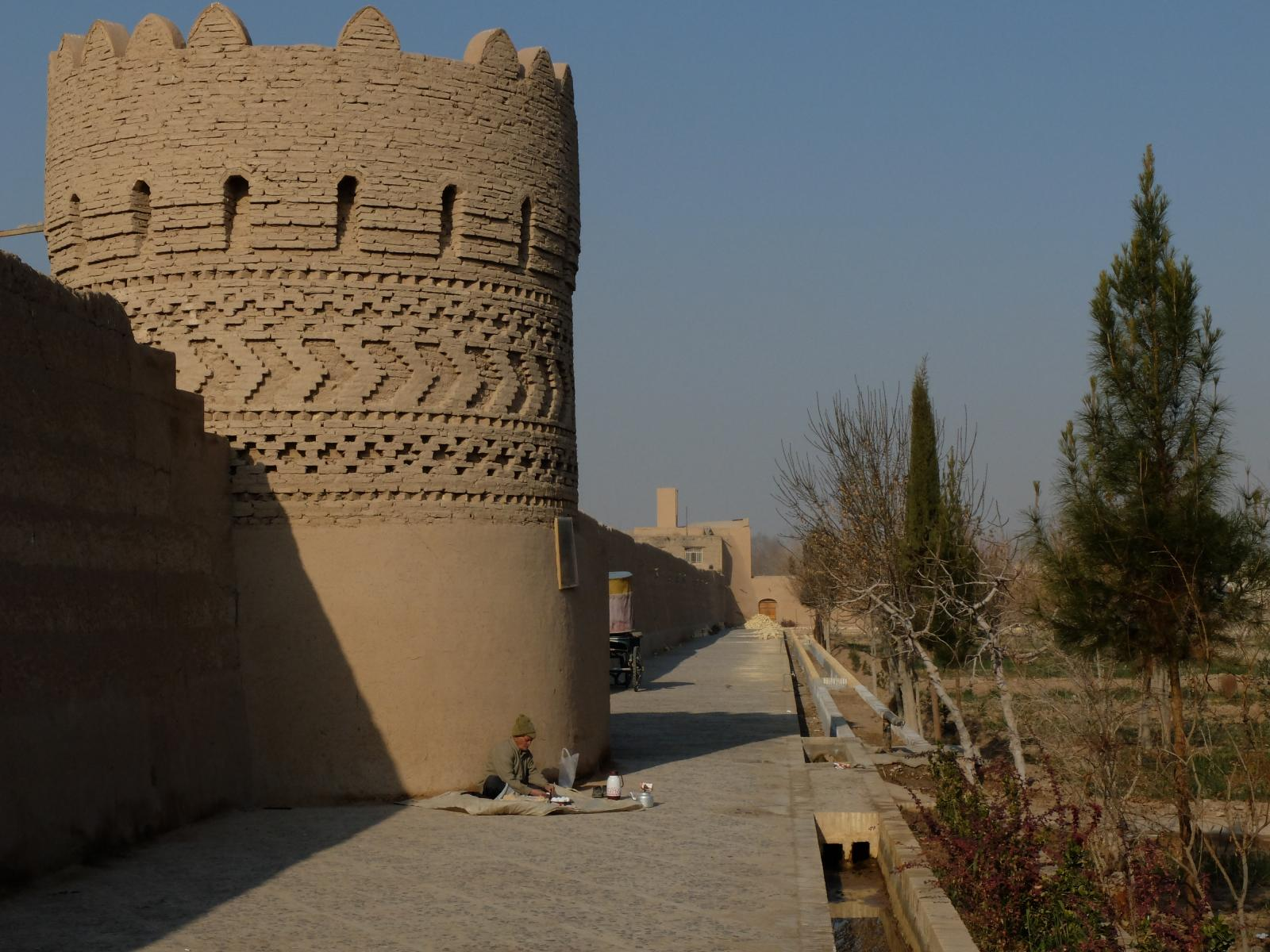
Tower of Bagh-e Dolat Abad, Yazd, Iran

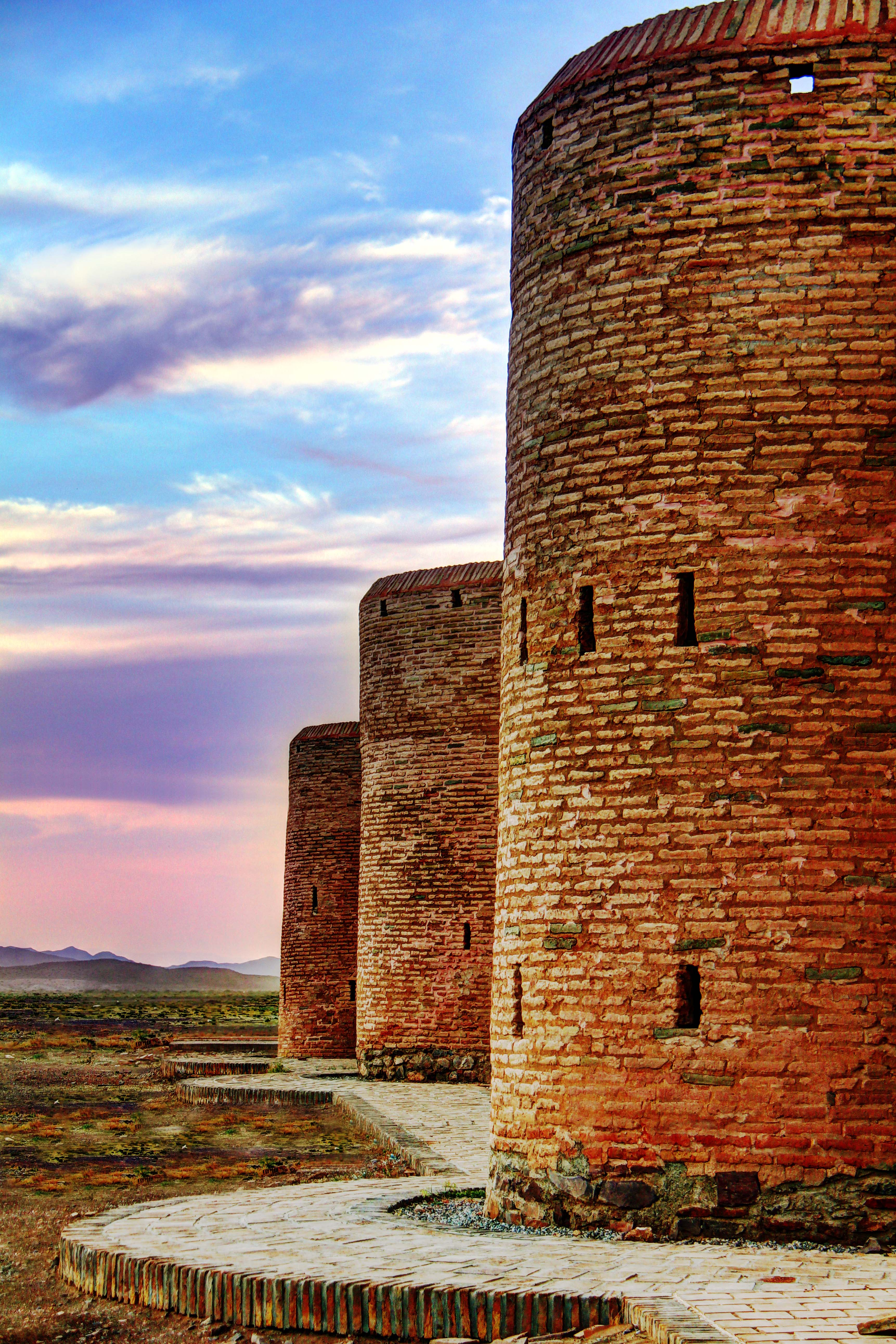
Towers of Miandasht caravanserai, Iran. Many caravanserais featured towers.

== See also ==
- Flanking tower
- Gate tower
- Half tower
- Martello tower
- Scottish Broch
- Tower house
- Witch tower
- Shell keep

== Sources ==
- Kennedy, Hugh (2000). Crusader Castles. Cambridge University Press. ISBN 0-521-79913-9.
- Toy, Sidney. Castles: Their Construction and History. ISBN 978-0-486-24898-1.
