= Stéphan Elmas =

Armenian composer (1862–1937)

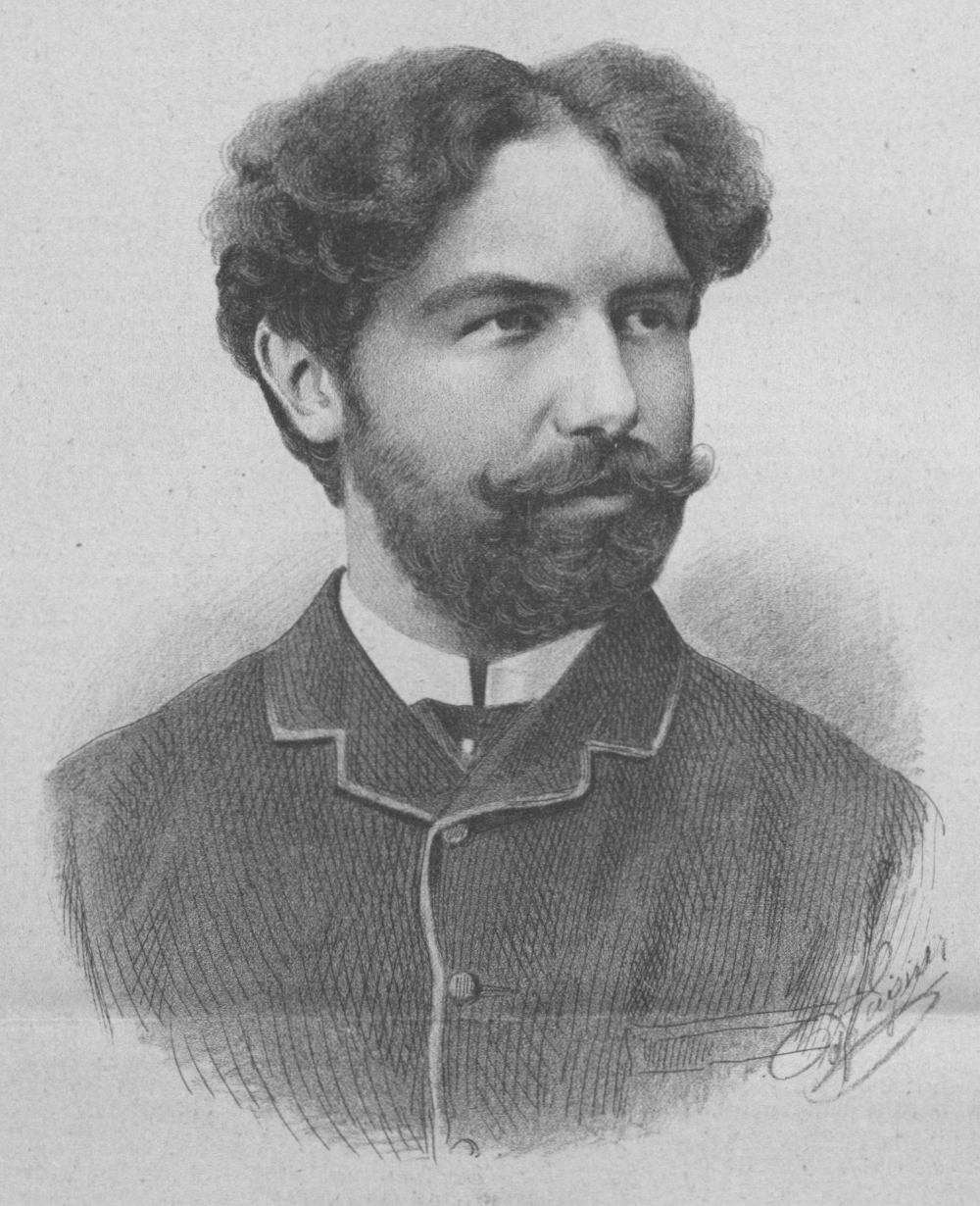
The young Stéphan Elmas in Vienna in February 1887 (portrait by Ignaz Eigner)

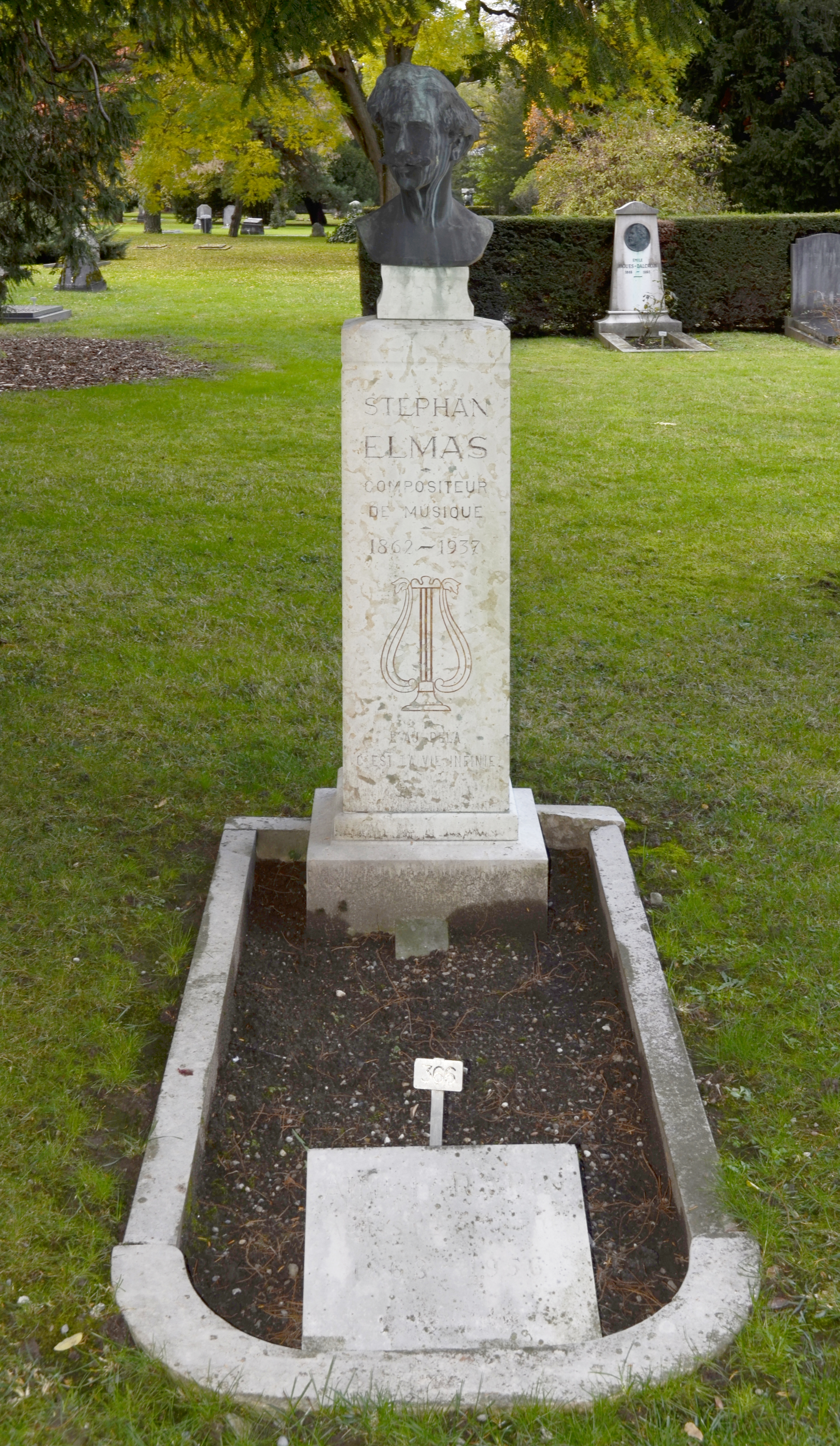
Tomb of Stéphan Elmas, Kings Cemetery, Geneva.

Stéphan Elmas (Armenian: Ստեփան Էլմաս; 1862 – August 11, 1937) was an Armenian composer, pianist and teacher.

== Life ==
Elmas was born into a family of wealthy entrepreneurs in Smyrna (now İzmir), a city in the Ottoman Empire. It was soon discovered that the little boy was a child prodigy: he began taking piano lessons and writing short piano pieces under the tutelage of a local music teacher, Mr. Moseer, and already at the age of 13, the young virtuoso performed an all-Liszt piano recital.

In July 1879, with the encouragement of his teacher – but against the wishes of his family – Stéphan Elmas left for Weimar, Germany, hoping to audition for Franz Liszt. Here he was able to meet the great master: Liszt advised him to go to Austria and work with Professor Anton Door at the Vienna Conservatory [a.k.a. University of Music and Performing Arts, Vienna] and Franz Krenn, the distinguished composer and church musician.

In Vienna, the 17-year-old Stéphan divided his time between studying the piano and composition, making his Vienna debut in 1885: an event which received many accolades in the press. Elmas continued to compose, writing many character pieces, including waltzes, mazurkas, nocturnes and impromptus. He dedicated his 6 Études (1881) to Franz Liszt and a number of pieces to Victor Hugo.

Elmas stayed in contact with Liszt and frequently sought his advice. In 1886, he briefly returned to his native Smyrna to attend his father’s funeral, but returned to Vienna convinced that Europe had much more to offer him. On February 24, 1887, he gave a highly successful recital in Vienna’s Bösendorfer-Saal. A busy concert schedule followed, with Elmas scoring artistic triumphs in France, England, Germany, Austria and Italy. He mostly programmed his own works, but also performed Beethoven, Chopin and Schumann.

During his travels, Elmas became closely acquainted with, among others, the Russian composer and pianist Anton Rubinstein, the French composer Jules Massenet and the French pianist Joseph-Édouard Risler. In 1912, he took up permanent residence in Geneva, Switzerland, where he continued to compose, teach and perform. Over time, Elmas became increasingly hard of hearing and grew somewhat of a bitter recluse, cutting himself off from the world.

Thankfully, he befriended Aimée Rapin (1868–1956), the armless Swiss painter, who nursed and consoled him during these difficult times. Elmas was also haunted by the tragic events of the 1915 Armenian genocide by the Ottoman Turks. Fortunately, his family was able to escape to Athens following the Great Fire of Smyrna in 1922 which followed the Turkish occupation of the city.

Stéphan Elmas dictated his memoirs to Krikor-Hagop, a young journalist. His piano, along with his manuscripts and reminiscences, is now housed at the Charents Museum of Literature and Arts of Armenia. The composer died in Geneva and was buried in the city’s Plainpalais cemetery.

Elmas composed rapidly and with great ease. Perhaps this explains why he sometimes did not revise his compositions sufficiently. However, many of his works are of high quality and perhaps he was most successful in composing his elegant and stylish salon pieces. These pieces seem to be composed for an earlier time: Elmas’s compositions tend to hark back towards the style of earlier, Romantic composers, rather than forward to the challenging times that were shaping the musical world at the beginning of the new century.

Established in 1988 under the artistic guidance of Alexandre Siranossian, the Stéphan Elmas Foundation aims to disseminate the legacy of the Armenian composer. Recently, the composer’s works have experienced a revival, thanks to the efforts of pianist Armen Babakhanian.

== Compositions ==
=== Piano with orchestra ===
- Piano Concerto No. 1 in G minor, 1882 https://www.youtube.com/watch?v=6mt3jdT1ZHs
- Piano Concerto No. 2, 1887 https://www.youtube.com/watch?v=gkNUcyu2EOA (published 1923 or earlier)
- Piano Concerto No. 3, 1900 https://www.youtube.com/watch?v=NY-3bKgq8Zg
- Andante cantabile et rondo pastorale
- Youth Concerto (not orchestrated; dedicated to Anton Rubinstein)

=== String orchestra ===
- Nocturne No. 4
- Romance

=== Piano (selected) ===
- 1 Arabesque
- 2 Aubades, Ballade, 2 Chansons, 2 Chants, Complainte, Eclogue, Elégie, Idylle, Ode, Romance, Sonnet, Stances (all dedicated to Victor Hugo)
- 2 Ballades
- 2 Barcarolles
- 2 Berceuses
- 2 Boleros
- 5 Dances Armeniennes
- 6 Études (dedicated to Franz Liszt) (published 1884 by Wetzler of Wien)
- 1 Fantaisie
- 1 Fantaisie – Mazurka
- 2 Impromptus
- 1 Impromptu – Mazurka
- 1 Marche Funèbre
- 27 Mazurkas
- 7 Nocturnes
- 6 Polonaises
- 1 Polonaise – Fantaisie
- 25 Preludes
- 1 Rondo
- 2 Scherzos
- 4 Sonatas (no.1 in B minor published 1923 or earlier)
- 9 Valses

=== Chamber music ===
- Romance
- Pièce de concert
- Piano Quartet in D minor
- Piano Trio in B♭ major(first published in 1923 or earlier)
- Adagio for violin and piano
- Nocturne no. 2 for violin and piano
- Nocturne no. 4 for violin and piano
- Romance for violin and piano

=== Vocal music ===
- L'Arménie Martyre
- Offrande
