= Daniel Rapin =

Swiss pharmacist and botanist (1799–1882)

Daniel Rapin (1799 in Payerne – 1882) was a Swiss pharmacist and botanist.

He worked as a pharmacist in Fribourg, Strasbourg, Paris, Geneva, Payerne (1832-1838) and Rolle (1838–1853). In 1853 he retired to Yverdon, later relocating to Plainpalais (Geneva) (1857). Taxa with the specific epithet of rapini are named after him, an example being Salix rapini.

== Selected works ==
- Guide du botaniste dans le canton de Vaud, 1842 – Botanists guide to the canton of Vaud.
- Méthode analytique pour les plantes phanérogames extrait de la flore français de De Candolle, 1846 – Analytic method for phanerogams from the French flora of de Candolle.
- Flore des plantes vénéneuses de la Suisse, 1849 – Poisonous plants native to Switzerland.
