= Gymnase intercantonal de la Broye =

Coordinates: 46°48′53″N 6°56′26″E

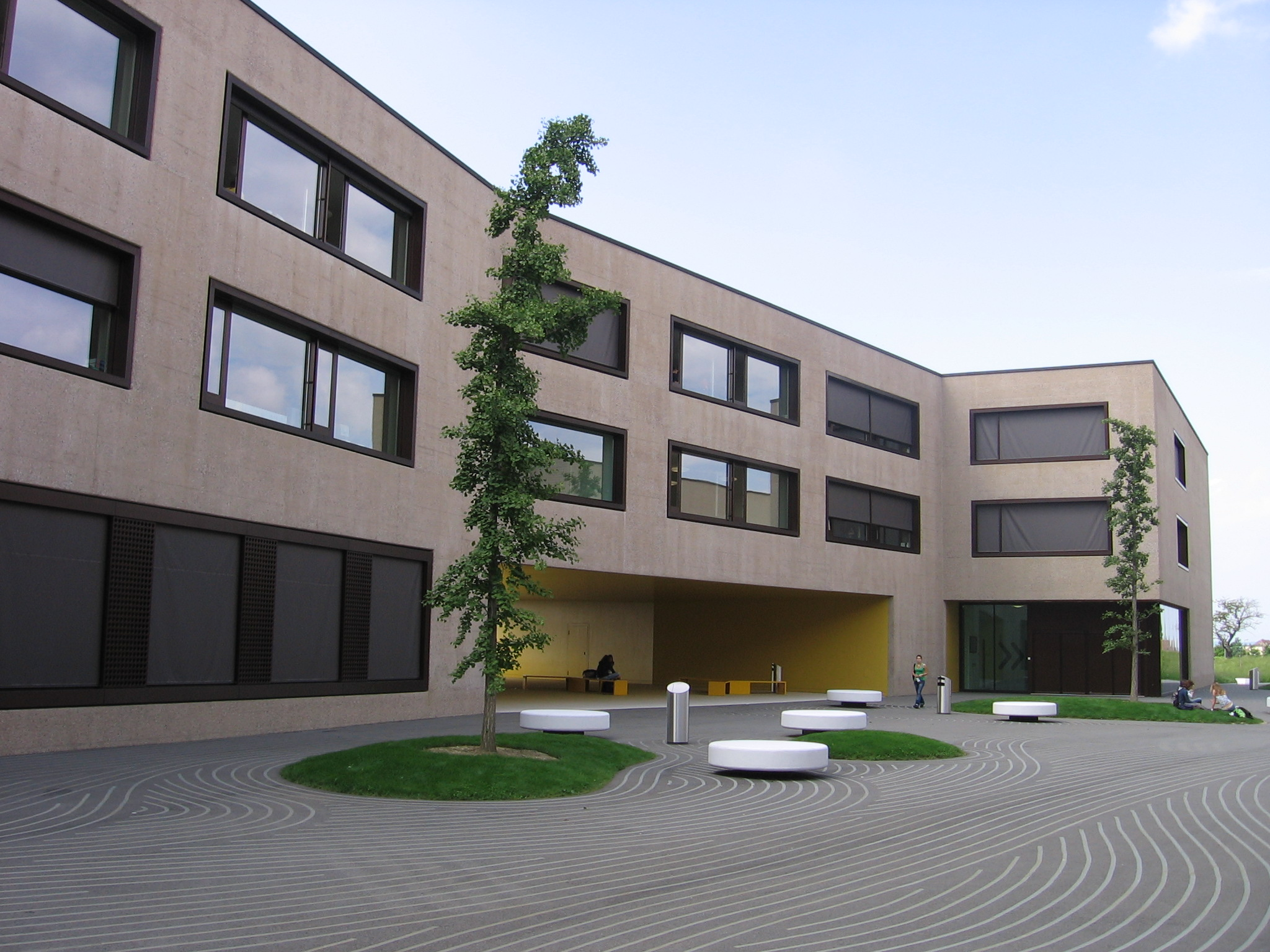

Information
- School type: Gymnasium
- Established: August 2005; 20 years ago
- Language: French; English (history course only)
- Accreditation: State Secretariat for Education, Research and Innovation
- Website: www.gyb.ch

The Gymnase intercantonal de la Broye (GYB) is a secondary school (gymnasium) in Payerne, Vaud, Switzerland. The school serves students living in the Broye-Vully district in Vaud canton and Broye district in Fribourg canton.

The school opened in August 2005. The municipalities in the service area include Vully commune and the regions of Avenches, Estavayer-le-lac, Moudon, and Payerne.

The school includes a library, the 350 conference room L'Aula, a 100-seat conference room, 40 computer labs, the exhibition space L'espace de la Blancherie, a gymnasium, and a fitness room.

== Accreditation ==
GYB's (upper) secondary education (Middle and High School) is approved as a Mittelschule/Collège/Liceo by the Swiss Federal State Secretariat for Education, Research and Innovation (SERI).
