= Payerne =

- Municipality
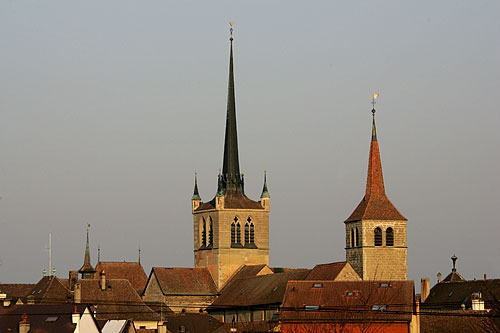
- The towers of the Abbey and the Reformed church above Payerne

- Flag Coat of arms
- Location of Payerne
- Location within Switzerland Location within Canton of Vaud
- Coordinates: 46°49′N 6°56′E
- Country: Switzerland
- Canton: Vaud
- District: Broye-Vully

Government
  - Mayor: Syndic; Lionel Voinçon

Area
  - Total: 24.19 km^{2} (9.34 sq mi)
- Elevation: 456 m (1,496 ft)

Population (2007)
  - Total: 8,065
  - Density: 333.4/km^{2} (863.5/sq mi)
- Demonym: Les Payernois
- Time zone: UTC+01:00 (CET)
  - Summer (DST): UTC+02:00 (CEST)
- Postal code: 1530
- SFOS number: 5822
- ISO 3166 code: CH-VD
- Localities: Corges, Etrabloz, Vers-chez-Perrin, Vers-chez-Savary
- Surrounded by: Bussy (FR), Corcelles-près-Payerne, Cugy (FR), Fétigny-Ménières (FR), Grandcour, Montagny (FR), Morens (FR), Rueyres-les-Prés (FR), Torny (FR), Trey
- Twin towns: Paray-le-Monial (France)
- Website: www.payerne.ch

Payerne (French: [pajɛʁn]; Arpitan: Payèrna) is a municipality in the Swiss canton of Vaud. It was the seat of the district of Payerne, and is now part of the district of Broye-Vully. The German name Peterlingen for the town is out of use.

== History ==
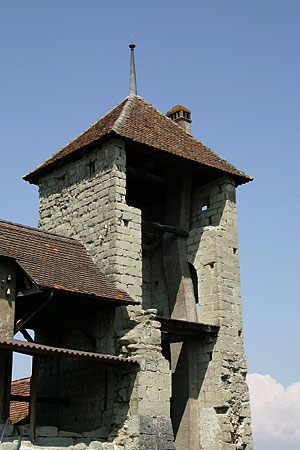
A tower of the old city wall

The earliest traces of settlements near Payerne include Neolithic objects and traces of a Bronze Age settlement. There are also burial mounds from the Hallstatt and Latène cultures, including gold necklaces which were found at Le Bois de Roverex. There was a Celtic bridge and a Roman era road in the area of Les Aventuri. There were Roman buildings within and outside the city walls, Roman cemeteries, and a dedicatory inscription of Publius Graccius Paternus. During the Early Middle Ages, the village of Payerne first appeared. In 587, Bishop Marius built the villa Paterniacum and a Chapel to St. Mary in the village. The chapel later developed into a parish church. The present Gothic building was built in the 14th century over Roman foundations. It was renovated in the 1990s. In the 10th century, the Cluniac Payerne Priory was founded. In 1033, Emperor Conrad II was crowned as the King of Burgundy in the priory church.

Payerne is first mentioned in 961 as ecclesie sancte Marie Paterniacensis though this comes from a 12th-century copy of the older document. In 1049 it was mentioned as in loco Paterniaco. The town was formerly known by its German name Peterlingen.

Before 1302 the prior granted the citizens the right to establish a council and create a seal. In 1348 the council created a town charter which was formally recognized. The leader of the town's Council of Twelve also served as the mayor and the town military leader or Bannerherr. In the 16th century a second twelve-member council (rière conseil) appeared, to handle trade disputes for which it was not necessary to call together all citizens and nobles. The citizenry and the monastery were often in conflict with each other. The town concluded treaties with Bern (1344), Fribourg (1349), the count of Neuchâtel (1355) and Murten (1364). In 1362 a hospital was built in the town. In 1395, a schoolmaster was mentioned, and in 1449 there was a secondary school.

After the conquest of Vaud in 1536, the town was granted a privileged legal position by Bern. The Schultheiss, who represented the Bernese interests, was a citizen of Payern, not a Bernese Vogt. The Schultheiss was subordinate to the town military leader (Bannerherr), who was elected by the citizens. The Bannerherr chaired the sixty member council, which was divided into the Conseil Premier Douze, the Conseil Second-Douze, and the Communauté which had 36 members. The Communauté included representative from the village of Corcelles and the surrounding hamlets. In 1769, the Council was reduced to 50 members. The City Council building of Payerne was built in 1572, and since 1964 has served as the seat of the District Court.

Aerial view from 300 m by Walter Mittelholzer (1919)

Guillaume Farel and Pierre Viret began to preach the Protestant Reformation in 1532–33 in Payerne. The town adopted the new faith even before the conquest by Bern. The territory of the Reformed parish coincided with the municipality.

A castle was built in 1640 on the grounds of the monastery as a residence for the Bernese representative. From the early 19th until the late 20th century, it housed the high school. In 1688 the town created a council for legislative reforms, followed in 1689 by one for weights and measures and in 1699, one for the care of orphans. The town had a court and an appeals court, with further appeals being sent to Bern. In 1617, the town refused to recognize the rights of Vaud. The city law was updated and printed in 1733. The city had a doctor, a surgeon and a pharmacist. Bern paid for three of the Regents at the College, while Payerne paid for a fourth. Starting in 1761 there was a teacher for girls, and in 1784 a German teacher was provided. In 1791 the town citizens rejected an order for forced labor on a nearby road and in 1795 they called for the division of the commons.

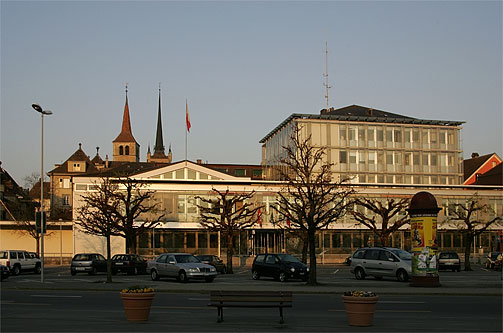
The new town hall of Payerne

In 1798 it was briefly the capital of the short lived canton of Sarine et Broye. From 1798 until 1802 it was the capital of the district of Payerne under the Helvetic Republic's canton of Fribourg. From 1802 until 2006 it was the capital of the district of Payerne in the canton of Vaud.

In the 1830s and 40s the city walls and three gates were demolished, only the four towers still remain. The former monastery town spread out in all directions, and grew gradually to meet the town of Corcelles. The old councils were replaced with a five-member executive council and a 70 member city council. The municipal elections of 1929 marked the end of the forty-year dominance of the Liberals. After the founding of the Christian Social Party in 1961, there was three-year period of tensions between Catholics and Protestants. In 1964 the town inaugurated its new City Hall.

== Geography ==
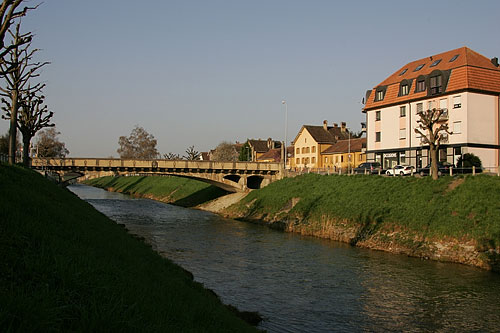
La Broye river at Payerne

Payerne has an area, as of 2009, of 24.19 square kilometers (9.34 sq mi). Of this area, 14.46 km^{2} (5.58 sq mi) or 59.8% is used for agricultural purposes, while 3.59 km^{2} (1.39 sq mi) or 14.8% is forested. Of the rest of the land, 5.67 km^{2} (2.19 sq mi) or 23.4% is settled (buildings or roads), 0.44 km^{2} (0.17 sq mi) or 1.8% is either rivers or lakes and 0.07 km^{2} (17 acres) or 0.3% is unproductive land.

Of the built up area, industrial buildings made up 1.9% of the total area while housing and buildings made up 6.6% and transportation infrastructure made up 11.0%. Power and water infrastructure as well as other special developed areas made up 1.1% of the area while parks, green belts and sports fields made up 2.8%. Out of the forested land, all of the forested land area is covered with heavy forests. Of the agricultural land, 52.2% is used for growing crops and 6.7% is pastures. All the water in the municipality is flowing water. From Payerne, the river Broye is running in a large and agricultural valley.

The municipality was the capital of the Payerne District until it was dissolved on 31 August 2006, and Payerne became part of the new district of Broye-Vully.

It consists of the town of Payerne and four hamlets including Vers-chez-Perrin.

== Coat of arms ==
The blazon of the municipal coat of arms is Party, argent and gules.

== Demographics ==
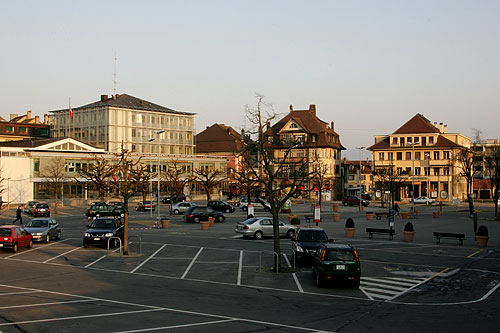
Town hall and central plaza in town

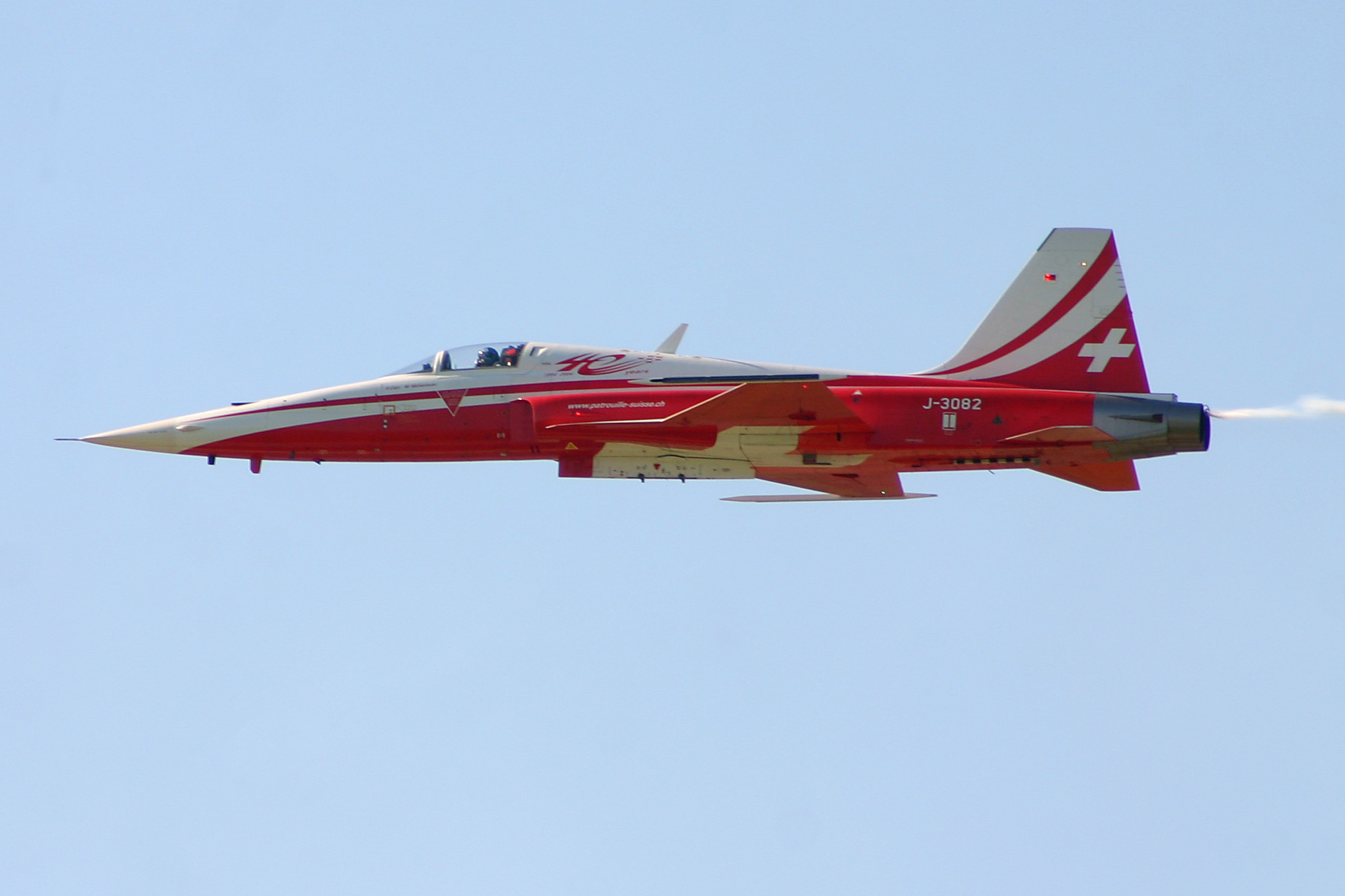
Patrouille Suisse F-5 from Payerne Air Base

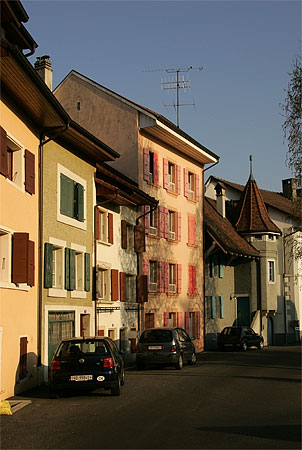
Houses in Payerne

Payerne has a population (as of December 2020) of 10,069. As of 2008, 32.0% of the population are resident foreign nationals. Over the last 10 years (1999–2009) the population has changed at a rate of 15.4%. It has changed at a rate of 14.6% due to migration and at a rate of 1.7% due to births and deaths.

Most of the population (as of 2000) speaks French (6,061 or 83.1%), with Portuguese being second most common (339 or 4.6%) and German being third (251 or 3.4%). There are 219 people who speak Italian and 1 person who speaks Romansh.

Of the population in the municipality, 2,418 or about 33.2% were born in Payerne and lived there in 2000. There were 1,210 or 16.6% who were born in the same canton, while 1,791 or 24.6% were born somewhere else in Switzerland, and 1,771 or 24.3% were born outside of Switzerland.

In 2008, there were 47 live births to Swiss citizens and 48 births to non-Swiss citizens, and in same time span there were 57 deaths of Swiss citizens and 10 non-Swiss citizen deaths. Ignoring immigration and emigration, the population of Swiss citizens decreased by 10 while the foreign population increased by 38. There were 5 Swiss men and 4 Swiss women who immigrated back to Switzerland. At the same time, there were 79 non-Swiss men and 84 non-Swiss women who immigrated from another country to Switzerland. The total Swiss population change in 2008 (from all sources, including moves across municipal borders) was an increase of 28 and the non-Swiss population increased by 99 people. This represents a population growth rate of 1.6%.

The age distribution, as of 2009, in Payerne is; 889 children or 10.6% of the population are between 0 and 9 years old and 1,084 teenagers or 13.0% are between 10 and 19. Of the adult population, 1,131 people or 13.5% of the population are between 20 and 29 years old. 1,060 people or 12.7% are between 30 and 39, 1,324 people or 15.8% are between 40 and 49, and 1,047 people or 12.5% are between 50 and 59. The senior population distribution is 832 people or 10.0% of the population are between 60 and 69 years old, 572 people or 6.8% are between 70 and 79, there are 346 people or 4.1% who are between 80 and 89, and there are 69 people or 0.8% who are 90 and older.

As of 2000, there were 2,798 people who were single and never married in the municipality. There were 3,517 married individuals, 583 widows or widowers and 396 individuals who are divorced.

As of 2000, there were 3,271 private households in the municipality, and an average of 2.2 persons per household. There were 1,221 households that consist of only one person and 151 households with five or more people. Out of a total of 3,301 households that answered this question, 37.0% were households made up of just one person and there were 23 adults who lived with their parents. Of the rest of the households, there are 844 married couples without children, 953 married couples with children. There were 195 single parents with a child or children. There were 35 households that were made up of unrelated people and 30 households that were made up of some sort of institution or another collective housing.

In 2000, there were 656 single family homes (or 48.6% of the total) out of a total of 1,349 inhabited buildings. There were 347 multi-family buildings (25.7%), along with 231 multi-purpose buildings that were mostly used for housing (17.1%) and 115 other use buildings (commercial or industrial) that also had some housing (8.5%). Of the single family homes 107 were built before 1919, while 85 were built between 1990 and 2000. The greatest number of single family homes (125) were built between 1981 and 1990. The most multi-family homes (96) were built before 1919 and the next most (65) were built between 1919 and 1945. There were 9 multi-family houses built between 1996 and 2000.

In 2000, there were 3,862 apartments in the municipality. The most common apartment size was 3 rooms of which there were 1,306. There were 268 single room apartments and 716 apartments with five or more rooms. Of these apartments, a total of 3,221 apartments (83.4% of the total) were permanently occupied, while 421 apartments (10.9%) were seasonally occupied and 220 apartments (5.7%) were empty. As of 2009, the construction rate of new housing units was 5 new units per 1000 residents. The vacancy rate for the municipality, in 2010, was 0.12%.

The historical population is given in the following chart:

== Heritage sites of national significance ==
The Payerne Abbey church and former convent buildings, the Ancien Tribunal, the Swiss Reformed Church of Notre-Dame and the Fountain du Banneret are listed as Swiss heritage site of national significance. The entire old city of Payerne is part of the Inventory of Swiss Heritage Sites.

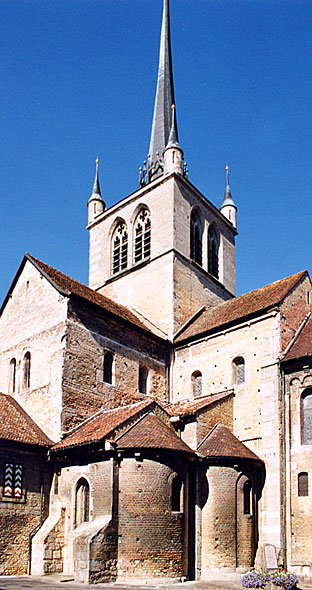
Abbey Church and Former Convent Buildings

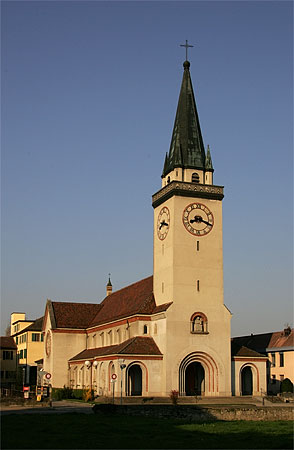
Catholic Church of Notre-Dame

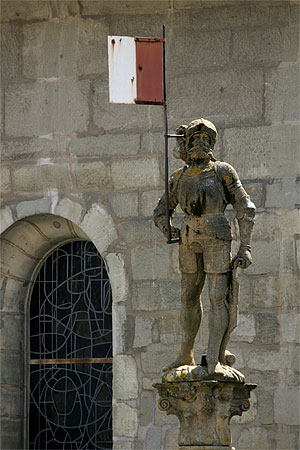
Fountain du Banneret

== Twin Town ==
Payerne is twinned with

- Paray-le-Monial, France

== Government ==
Payerne Airport is home to the air investigation division of the Swiss Transportation Safety Investigation Board (formerly the Swiss Accident Investigation Board). Previously this was the head office of the Aircraft Accident Investigation Bureau, before its 2011 merger into the SAIB.

Payerne is also the home of a major airbase of the Swiss Air Force.

== Culture ==
=== Payerne sausage ===
The Payerne sausage (French: saucisson de Payerne) is local variant on the regional Boutefas or Saucisson vaudois sausage. It is a cold smoked pork sausage in a natural casing and has been a traditional dish since the mid-19th century. The IGP protected Saucisson Vaudois IGP and the partly AOC protected Boutefas sausage are made from pigs that foraged for acorns in Vaud or Fribourg woods and drank local water. While the Payerne sausage is not a protected name, the pigs usually come from the same region and eat the same diet. The major difference between Payerne sausage and other local varieties is that the lees from wine or other alcohol and cooked, chopped rind or pork skin is added to the mixture.

== Politics ==
In the 2007 federal election the most popular party was the SVP which received 27.72% of the vote. The next three most popular parties were the SP (22.86%), the FDP (22.74%) and the LPS Party (9.05%). In the federal election, a total of 1,790 votes were cast, and the voter turnout was 40.0%.

== Economy ==
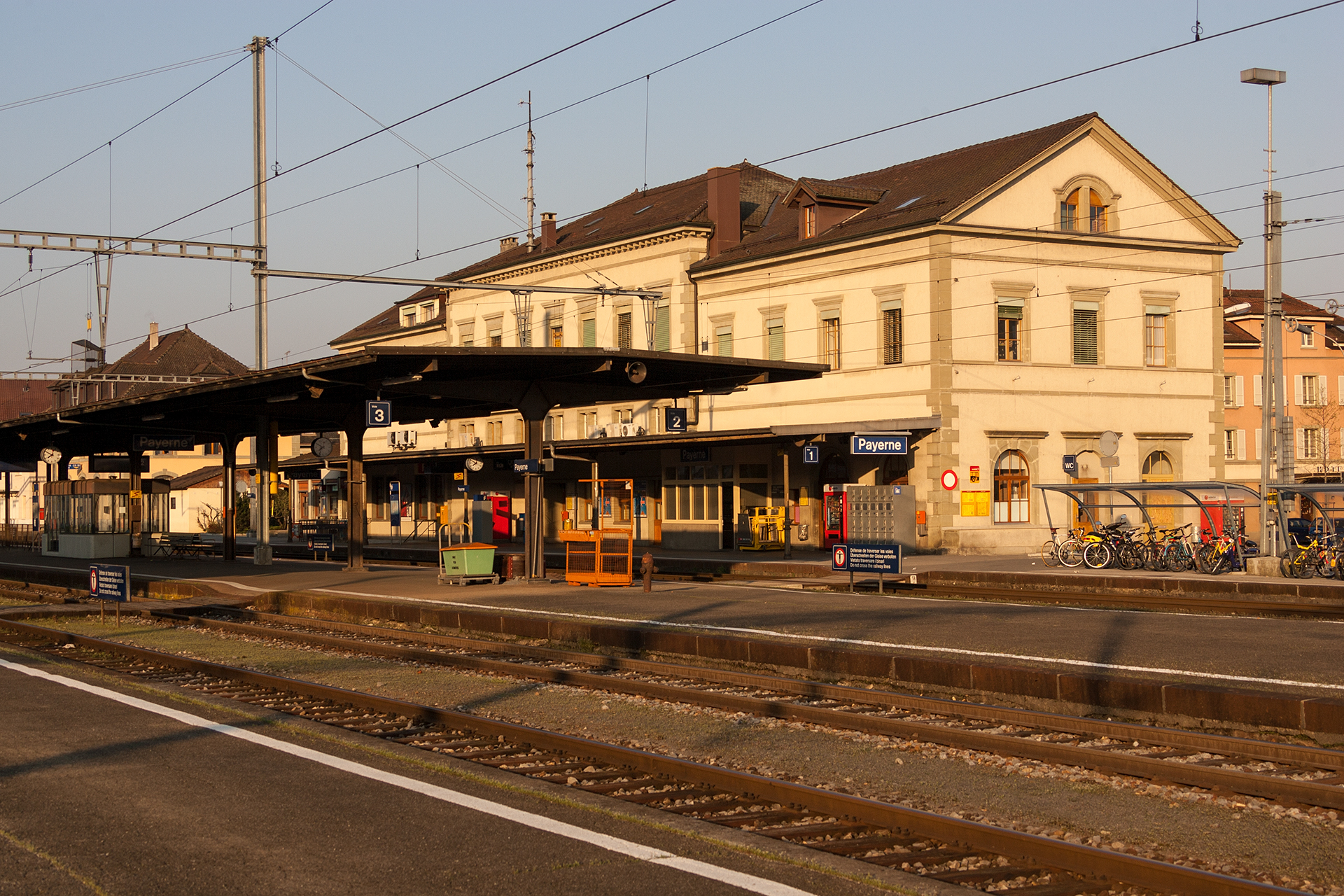
Train station in Payerne

As of 2010, Payerne had an unemployment rate of 7.5%. As of 2008, there were 113 people employed in the primary economic sector and about 39 businesses involved in this sector. 728 people were employed in the secondary sector and there were 86 businesses in this sector. 4,270 people were employed in the tertiary sector, with 389 businesses in this sector. There were 3,500 residents of the municipality who were employed in some capacity, of which females made up 42.5% of the workforce.

In 2008 the total number of full-time equivalent jobs was 4,284. The number of jobs in the primary sector was 80, of which 79 were in agriculture and were in fishing or fisheries. The number of jobs in the secondary sector was 690 of which 326 or (47.2%) were in manufacturing, 1 was in mining and 309 (44.8%) were in construction. The number of jobs in the tertiary sector was 3,514. In the tertiary sector; 841 or 23.9% were in wholesale or retail sales or the repair of motor vehicles, 135 or 3.8% were in the movement and storage of goods, 155 or 4.4% were in a hotel or restaurant, 12 or 0.3% were in the information industry, 130 or 3.7% were the insurance or financial industry, 164 or 4.7% were technical professionals or scientists, 253 or 7.2% were in education and 672 or 19.1% were in health care.

In 2000, there were 2,512 workers who commuted into the municipality and 1,573 workers who commuted away. The municipality is a net importer of workers, with about 1.6 workers entering the municipality for every one leaving. Of the working population, 9.3% used public transportation to get to work, and 61.6% used a private car.

== Religion ==
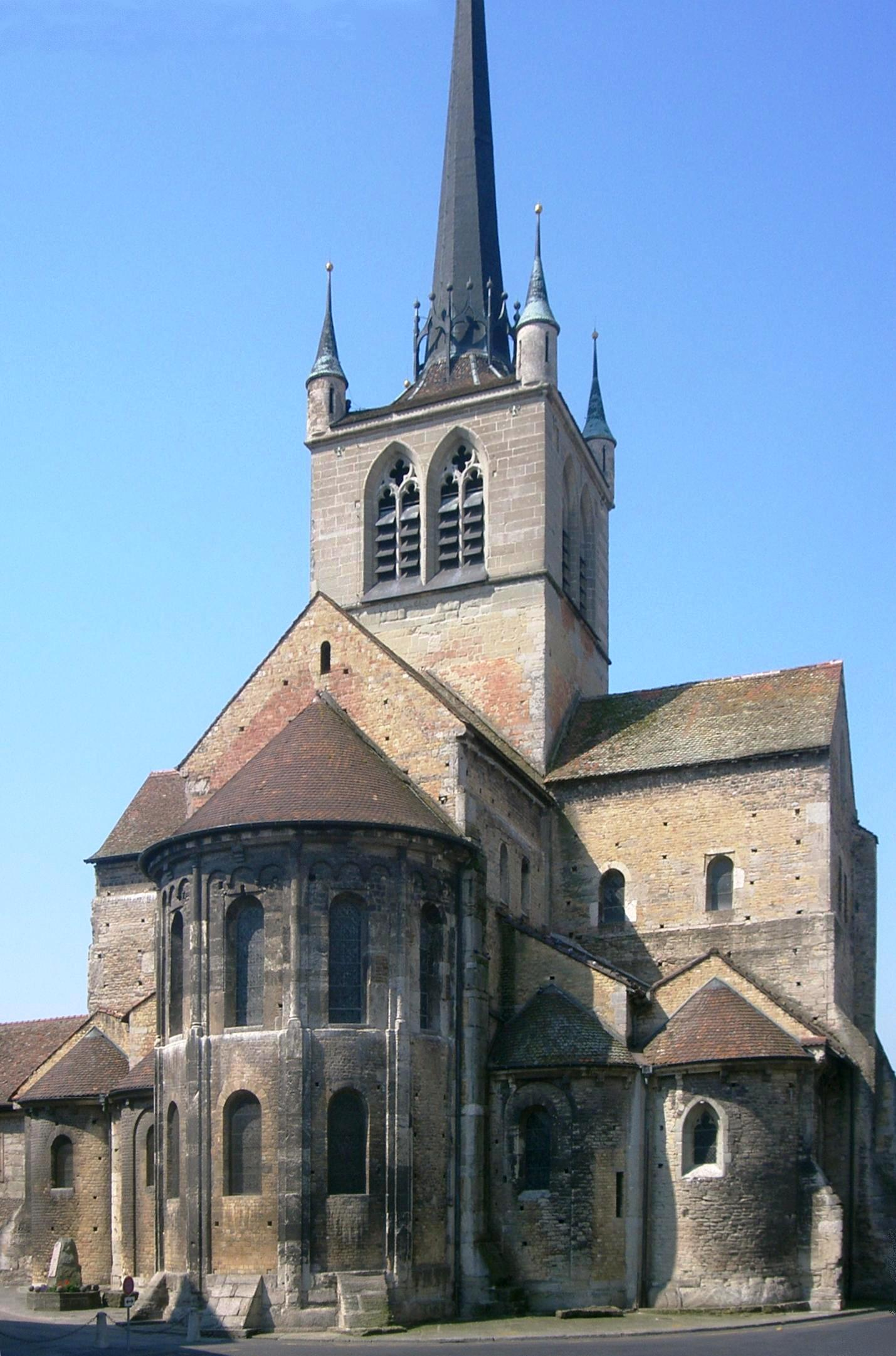
Former abbey church of Notre-Dame

From the 2000 census, 3,379 or 46.3% were Roman Catholic, while 2,666 or 36.6% belonged to the Swiss Reformed Church. Of the rest of the population, there were 81 members of an Orthodox church (or about 1.11% of the population), there were 6 individuals (or about 0.08% of the population) who belonged to the Christian Catholic Church, and there were 97 individuals (or about 1.33% of the population) who belonged to another Christian church. There were 4 individuals (or about 0.05% of the population) who were Jewish, and 356 (or about 4.88% of the population) who were Islamic. There were 12 individuals who were Buddhist, 10 individuals who were Hindu and 3 individuals who belonged to another church. 533 (or about 7.31% of the population) belonged to no church, are agnostic or atheist, and 147 individuals (or about 2.02% of the population) did not answer the question.

== Education ==
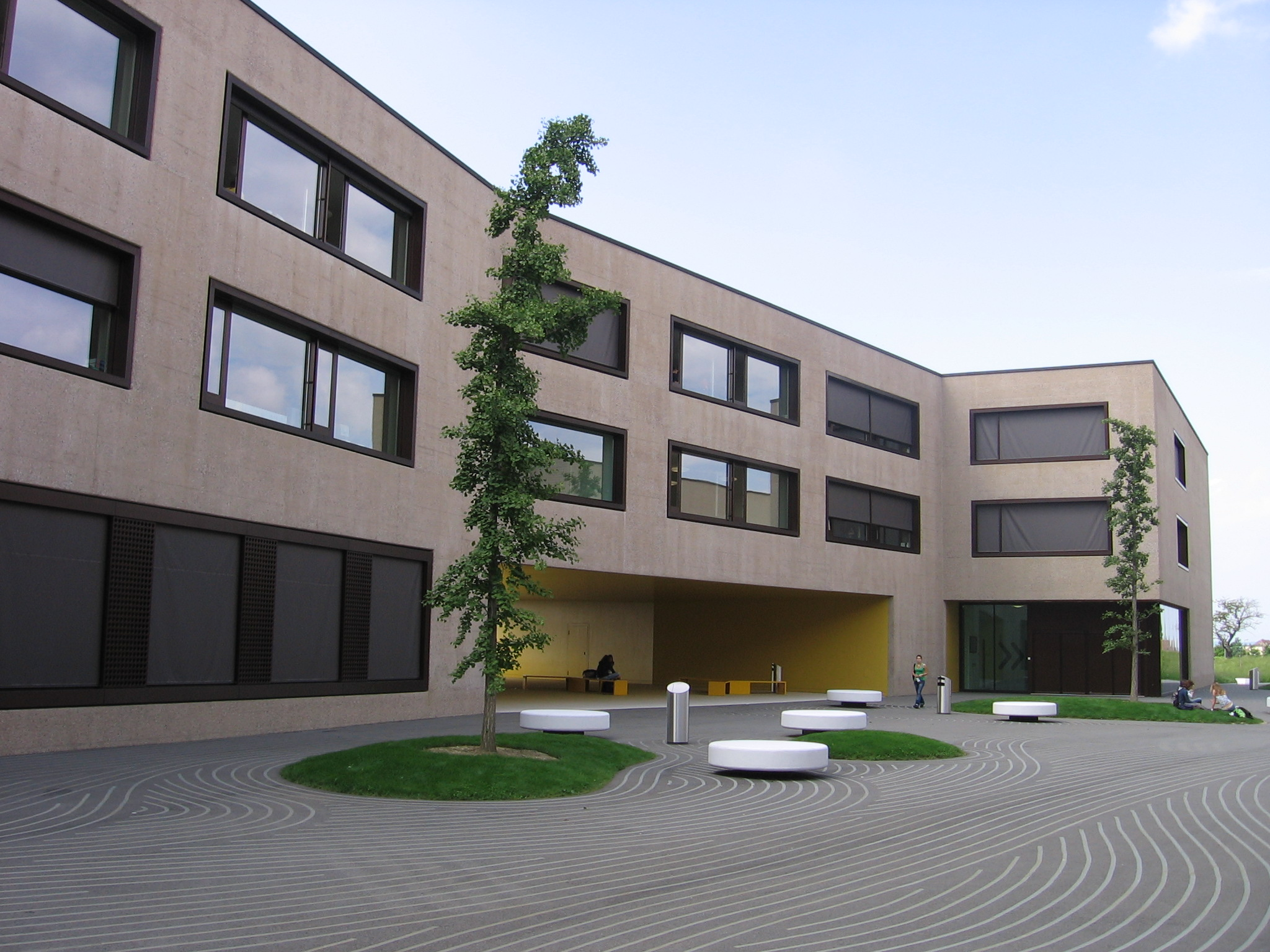
Gymnase Intercantonal de la Broye (upper secondary school)

In Payerne, about 2,517 or (34.5%) of the population have completed non-mandatory upper secondary education, and 578 or (7.9%) have completed additional higher education (either university or a Fachhochschule). Of the 578 who completed tertiary schooling, 61.9% were Swiss men, 23.0% were Swiss women, 7.6% were non-Swiss men and 7.4% were non-Swiss women.

In the 2009-10 school year, there were a total of 1,102 students in the Payerne school district. In the Vaud cantonal school system, two years of non-obligatory pre-school are provided by the political districts. During the school year, the political district provided pre-school care for a total of 155 children of which 83 children (53.5%) received subsidized pre-school care. The canton's primary school program requires students to attend for four years. There were 585 students in the municipal primary school program. The obligatory lower secondary school program lasts for six years and there were 500 students in those schools. There were also 17 students who were home schooled or attended another non-traditional school.

Payerne is home to 1 museum, the Musée de l'aviation militaire. In 2009, it was visited by 8,000 visitors (the average in previous years was 11,008).

As of 2000, there were 332 students in Payerne who came from another municipality, while 165 residents attended schools outside the municipality.

=== Schools ===
Gymnase Intercantonal de la Broye serves students from Payerne.

Établissement secondaire de Payerne et Environs serves secondary students from Payerne and other close towns. It has 4 separate buildings.

Établissement primaire de Payerne-Corcelles et Environs serves primary students from Payerne and other close towns. It has 6 separate buildings, which one is in Corcelles-près-Payerne, and another one in Grandcour, Buses are available to children unable to go to these places.

== Climate ==
Between 1991 and 2020 Payerne had an average of 111.7 days of rain or snow per year and on average received 854 mm (33.6 in) of precipitation. The wettest month was July during which time Payerne received an average of 92 mm (3.6 in) of rain or snow. During this month there was precipitation for an average of 10.0 days. The month with the most days of precipitation was May, with an average of 11.3, but with only 96 mm (3.8 in) of rain or snow. The driest month of the year was February with an average of 43 mm (1.7 in) of precipitation over 7.8 days.

Climate data for Payerne, elevation 490 m (1,610 ft), (1991–2020)
Month	Jan	Feb	Mar	Apr	May	Jun	Jul	Aug	Sep	Oct	Nov	Dec	Year
Mean daily maximum °C (°F)	3.7 (38.7)	5.6 (42.1)	10.8 (51.4)	15.0 (59.0)	19.2 (66.6)	23.0 (73.4)	25.5 (77.9)	25.0 (77.0)	20.0 (68.0)	14.3 (57.7)	7.9 (46.2)	4.2 (39.6)	14.5 (58.1)
Daily mean °C (°F)	0.9 (33.6)	1.8 (35.2)	5.7 (42.3)	9.3 (48.7)	13.6 (56.5)	17.3 (63.1)	19.3 (66.7)	18.8 (65.8)	14.5 (58.1)	10.0 (50.0)	4.9 (40.8)	1.7 (35.1)	9.8 (49.6)
Mean daily minimum °C (°F)	−1.9 (28.6)	−1.8 (28.8)	1.0 (33.8)	3.7 (38.7)	8.0 (46.4)	11.6 (52.9)	13.3 (55.9)	13.2 (55.8)	9.6 (49.3)	6.1 (43.0)	1.8 (35.2)	−1.1 (30.0)	5.3 (41.5)
Average precipitation mm (inches)	49.8 (1.96)	43.0 (1.69)	52.2 (2.06)	64.3 (2.53)	85.3 (3.36)	88.1 (3.47)	91.8 (3.61)	88.8 (3.50)	74.1 (2.92)	85.5 (3.37)	66.2 (2.61)	64.6 (2.54)	853.7 (33.61)
Average snowfall cm (inches)	8.5 (3.3)	7.4 (2.9)	4.2 (1.7)	0.4 (0.2)	0.0 (0.0)	0.0 (0.0)	0.0 (0.0)	0.0 (0.0)	0.0 (0.0)	0.1 (0.0)	3.9 (1.5)	8.9 (3.5)	33.4 (13.1)
Average precipitation days (≥ 1.0 mm)	8.7	7.8	8.2	8.8	11.3	10.4	10.0	9.6	8.3	10.1	8.9	9.6	111.7
Average snowy days (≥ 1.0 cm)	2.6	2.4	1.2	0.1	0.0	0.0	0.0	0.0	0.0	0.1	1.0	2.3	9.7
Average relative humidity (%)	85	80	73	70	73	72	70	73	79	85	86	86	78
Mean monthly sunshine hours	60.1	94.9	157.9	187.4	207.8	234.6	254.3	235.7	179.4	113.0	60.8	45.7	1,831.6
Percentage possible sunshine	24	36	46	48	47	52	56	56	51	37	24	20	44
Source 1: NOAA
Source 2: MeteoSwiss

== Transportation ==
The municipality has a railway station, Payerne on the Palézieux–Lyss and Fribourg–Yverdon lines. It has regular service to Lausanne, Kerzers, Fribourg/Freiburg, and Yverdon-les-Bains.

== Notable people ==
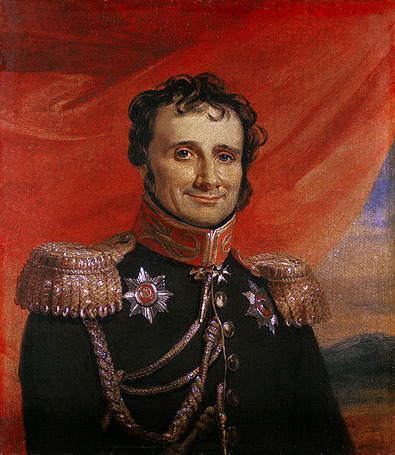
Antoine-Henri Jomini

- Frédéric-Louis Allamand (1736 in Payerne – 1809) a Swiss botanist, he moved to Leiden, Netherlands in 1749
- Antoine-Henri, Baron Jomini (1779 in Payerne – 1869) a Swiss officer who served as a general in the French and later in the Russian service
- Daniel Rapin (1799 in Payerne – 1882) a Swiss pharmacist and botanist
- Aimée Rapin (1868 in Payerne – 1956) a Swiss portrait artist born without arms
- Charles Estoppey (1820 in Payerne – 1888) was a Swiss politician, in 1875 he was elected to the Swiss Federal Council
- Hélène Monastier (1882 in Payerne – 1976) a Swiss peace activist
- Léon Savary (1895–1968), a Swiss writer and journalist
- Jacques Chessex (1934 in Payerne – 2009) a Swiss author and painter
- Mat Rebeaud (born 1982 in Payerne) a Swiss freestyle motocross rider
- Charles-André Doudin (born 1986 in Payerne) a Swiss professional footballer
