= Emma Ott =

Swiss nurse (1907–2011)

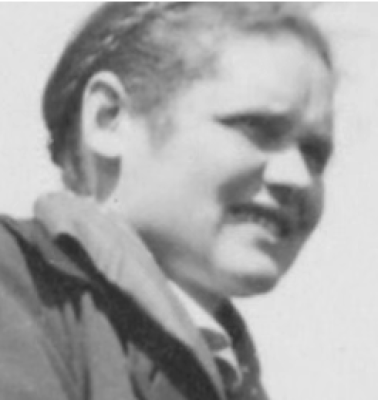
- Born: 20 November 1907; Winterthur, Switzerland
- Died: 15 May 2011 (aged 103); Bern, Switzerland
- Resting place: Rosenberg Cemetery
- Occupation: Nurse

Emma Ott (20 November 1907 in Winterthur–15 May 2011 in Bern) was a Swiss nurse.

== Biography ==
After attending secondary school in Winterthur, Emma Ott worked from 1921 to 1927 as a domestic servant in Winterthur, Schönenwerd, and Lucerne. In 1928, she volunteered for several weeks with the Service Civil International (SCI) in the Principality of Liechtenstein.

After training as a nurse (1932–1936) at the Engeried nursing school in Bern, she worked as a nurse at the Albert Schweitzer hospital in Lambaréné until 1939, where she met Rösli Näf. Upon her return, she worked at the Tiefenauspital in Bern and performed active service as a health nurse within the Women’s Auxiliary Service (SCF).

From May 1942, she worked for the Swiss Red Cross Children’s Aid in the internment camps in southern France, Gurs internment camp and Camp de Rivesaltes, where Friedel Bohny-Reiter and Elsa Lüthi-Ruth also worked as nurses. She wrote the first report on the deportations from the Gurs camp in August 1942, when she represented Elsbeth Kasser there.

In October 1943, Emma Ott took over from Roslï Näf the management of the children’s colony at Château de la Hille in Montégut-Plantaurel (Ariège Department), as Näf had to return to Switzerland in May 1943. Like her colleague Anne-Marie Im Hof-Piguet, she helped Jewish youths escape. However, she was not honored as a Righteous Among the Nations, as she always remained in the background.

In March 1945, she was called upon by the Toulouse Children’s Aid Center to take over the management of the Swiss Maternity Hospital in Montagnac (Aveyron Department) from an employee of Élisabeth Eidenbenz, who had returned to Switzerland in October 1944. There, mothers and children found a new refuge after the closure of the Elne Swiss Maternity Hospital. After moving again from Montagnac to Pau, she managed the nursery (births now took place in the hospital) from January to May 1946, this time for the Swiss Donation for War Victims, before returning to Switzerland. The six-month leave at Tiefenau Hospital had turned into four years.

Upon her return to Switzerland, she worked again at the Tiefenauspital in Bern until her retirement in 1972, where she had become head nurse. Until the age of 98, she lived alone in Bern, visiting the city market, making regular visits, and corresponding with people worldwide.

Her estate is held at the Swiss Archives of Contemporary History in Zurich.

== Films ==
- 2009: Anne-Marie Im Hof-Piguet: Juste parmi les nations, 50 min
- 1987: La Filière by Jacqueline Veuve, 37 min.

== Bibliography ==
- Im Hof-Piguet, Anne-Marie (1985). La filière en France occupée, 1942-1944 [The Escape Route in Occupied France, 1942-1944] (in French). Yverdon-les-Bains: Éditions de la Thièle. ISBN 2-8283-0019-6.
- Im Hof-Piguet, Anne-Marie (1985). Fluchtweg durch die Hintertür. Eine Rotkreuz-Helferin im besetzten Frankreich 1942–1944 [Escape Route Through the Back Door. A Red Cross Helper in Occupied France 1942–1944] (in German). Frauenfeld: Verlag im Waldgut. ISBN 3-7294-0045-2.
- Steiger, Sebastian (1992). Les enfants du château de La Hille [The Children of Château de La Hille] (in French). Basel: Brunnen-Verlag. ISBN 978-3-7655-1540-8.
- Helena Kanyar Becker, ed. (2010). Femmes oubliées. Aide humanitaire aux enfants et politique officielle des réfugiés 1917–1948 [Forgotten Women. Humanitarian Aid to Children and Official Refugee Policy 1917–1948] (in French). Basel: Schwabe Verlag. ISBN 978-3-7965-2695-4.

=== External links ===
- "Ariège: Les enfants du château de la Hille" [Ariège: The Children of Château de la Hille]. Ariège (in French). Archived from the original on 2015-09-23.
- "Ariège: Musée des enfants du château de la Hille" [Ariège: Museum of the Children of Château de la Hille]. Ariège (in French). Archived from the original on 2016-04-16.
- "Sebastian Steiger - Les enfants du château de La Hille" [Sebastian Steiger - The Children of Château de La Hille]. Circulaire de Fribourg (in French).
