= Hegnauer =

Hegnauer is a surname. Notable people with the surname include:

- Idy Hegnauer (1909–2006), Swiss nurse and peace activist
- John Hegnauer (fl. 1962–1979), American stone carver
- Ralph Hegnauer (1910–1997), Swiss peace activist, husband of Idy
