= Edith Auerbach =

German artist (1899–1994)

- Born: 11 March 1899; Cologne, Germany
- Died: 27 May 1994 (aged 95); Paris, France
- Other name: Irène Delamare
- Known for: Painting; drawing
- Movement: Expressionism;

Edith Auerbach, also known as Edith Auerbach-Delamare (1899–1994), was a German painter. In the 1920s, she moved to Paris, where she produced numerous sketches of the patrons at her favourite bars, including artists and writers. In 1940, she was interned in the south of France and, due to her Jewish origins, was in danger of being deported to Auschwitz. After the war, she processed her time in the internment camp with disturbing paintings, only to abandon painting altogether a few years later.

== Early life ==
Auerbach was born on 11 March 1899 in Cologne. She was one of two daughters in a liberal Jewish family. Her father, Benjamin Auerbach (1855–1940), was a physician and director of the Israelite Asylum for the Sick and Elderly. Her mother, Ida Auerbach-Kohn (1869–1942), was a teacher and dedicated social worker, chairwoman of the Israelite Women's Association in Cologne from 1923 to 1939, and for a time a board member of the Jewish Women's League, who came from Bennisch (today's Horní Benešov) in the Czech Republic. One of her two brothers, Fritz, emigrated to the USA in 1905, called himself Frederick Kerry, and became a successful businessman. One of his grandchildren is the US politician John Kerry. Her younger sister, Lisbeth, became a physician. The Austrian art historian Erica Tietze-Conrat was one of her cousins. From 1918 to 1923, Auerbach studied philosophy and art history in Munich, Cologne, and Bonn. From 1923 to 1924, she trained at the State Ceramics College in Höhr-Grenzhausen, near Koblenz. She then briefly ran a ceramics studio in Munich.

== As an artist in Paris ==
In 1926, Auerbach moved to Paris and rented a room in an artists' hotel, the Hôtel des Terrasses, where the other occupants were almost exclusively men, such as the German painter Hans Reichel, the Hungarian photographer Brassaï, the Hungarian illustrator Gyula Zilzer, the Austrian writer Alfred Perlès, and the French writer Raymond Queneau. The American writer, Henry Miller, was a regular visitor.

In Paris, she earned her living primarily through illustrations, such as an article about Le Dôme Café for the Kölnische Illustrierte Zeitung. She was a regular at the artists' cafés of Montparnasse and, over the years, produced hundreds of sketches of the patrons of her favourite bars and of people in the streets. She drew, among others, Miller, Reichel, Brassaï, Kees van Dongen, Chaim Soutine, Tsuguharu Foujita, Antoine Bourdelle, Lajos Tihanyi, Moissey Kogan, Emery Kelen, André Kertész, Alfred Flechtheim, Alice Prin, Ernő Goldfinger, and Charles Rappoport, as well as numerous less-famous people. She also undertook working trips to the South of France, Iberia, Morocco, and Palestine, where she mainly painted still lifes and landscapes. Auerbach participated in group exhibitions at the Salon des Tuileries and the Salon d'Automne, and in 1937 participated in the avant-garde exhibition Les Femme Artistes d'Europe in Paris.

== War and Camps ==
In 1937, Auerbach participated in an exhibition whose proceeds benefited refugees, predominantly Jewish, from Germany. Her sister Lisbeth emigrated to the USA shortly after 1933, and her parents followed in 1940. Edith Auerbach never saw her parents again: they died in the USA; her father in 1940, her mother two years later.

Auerbach remained in Paris and attempted to become a French citizen, but was denied. When the German Wehrmacht approached Paris in May 1940, she was interned in the Vélodrome d'Hiver, like all women over the age of 17 of German origin, even though most of them lived in France because they were opponents of the Nazi regime. In this cycling stadium, Auerbach met the writer and philosopher Hannah Arendt, the photographer Maria Eisner, and the film star Dita Parlo among the 2,000 women. From there, the women were deported to the Gurs internment camp in the Pyrenees in southern France, which was administered by the Vichy regime and where appalling conditions prevailed. Her fellow inmate and barracks senior, Hanna Schramm, tried to support her by choosing her to go shopping outside the camp. She made drawings of Elsbeth Kasser and Elisabeth Eidenbenz, two volunteers from a Swiss aid organization, which are now part of the Kasser collection in the Swiss Archives of Contemporary History in Zurich. In 1942 and 1943, transports of Jewish prisoners to Auschwitz took place; although Auerbach was spared, she could not cope psychologically with the constant tension. In early 1943, she was admitted to a hospital, from where she was eventually able to escape and go into hiding under the name Irène Delamare.

== After 1944 ==
After the liberation of Paris, Auerbach returned to the French capital in the late summer of 1944. She attempted, without success, to emigrate to the USA. She called the moving images she now created, with which she processed her traumatic experiences, Contre l'Oubli (Against Forgetting). The disturbing paintings depicted soulless figures behind barbed wire. From the early 1950s, she stopped painting and concentrated on journalism. Until the 1960s, she wrote regularly for the German magazine Weltkunst.

== Death and rediscovery ==
Auerbach died in Paris on 27 May 1994 at the age of 95 and was buried in the Cimetière parisien de Thiais (the grave no longer exists).

A few years after her death, the Dutch art dealer Guus Maris discovered some of her work at a Paris flea market. The art collector Michiel Levit acquired the works, preserved the collection as a whole, and also purchased later-discovered works. The entire collection passed into the hands of Sasja Winters in March 2025. Auerbach's life was also, coincidentally, researched by the art historian Bruno Chenique, who had built up a large collection of photographs and other biographic information. From July to September 2020, her drawings and paintings were exhibited at the Museum Belvédère in Heerenveen, Netherlands under the title Contre l'Oubli. From September 2021 to January 2022 the exhibition was shown at the Wiesbaden Women's Museum.

On 7 March 2025, International Women's Day, Auerbachplatz in Cologne-Sülz, which had previously been named solely after her father, Benjamin Auerbach, was also dedicated to her, her mother, Ida, and her sister, Lisbeth.
