= Switzerland Yearly Meeting =

Switzerland Yearly Meeting of the Religious Society of Friends, or simply Switzerland Yearly Meeting or SYM, is the organizing body for Quaker groups and meetings in Switzerland.

== History ==
The first known Swiss member of the Society of Friends is Theophilus Waldmeier (1832–1915), missionary to Ethiopia and Lebanon.

SYM is rooted on one side with Swiss citizens involved in several movements like the Religious Socialists, the International Fellowship of Reconciliation and Service Civil International, and on another side with the presence of Quakers from England and the United States of America. Leading figures were Hélène Monastier (1882–1976) and Pierre Ceresole (1879–1945), and later on Edmond Privat (1889–1962).

Local worshipping groups held their first regular meetings in Geneva and Zürich in the beginning of the 1920s. The first national gathering of Friends and friends of Friends took place in 1934, and went on every year, under the umbrella of London Yearly Meeting. It became the Swiss General Meeting in 1939. The status of an independent Yearly Meeting was given in 1947.

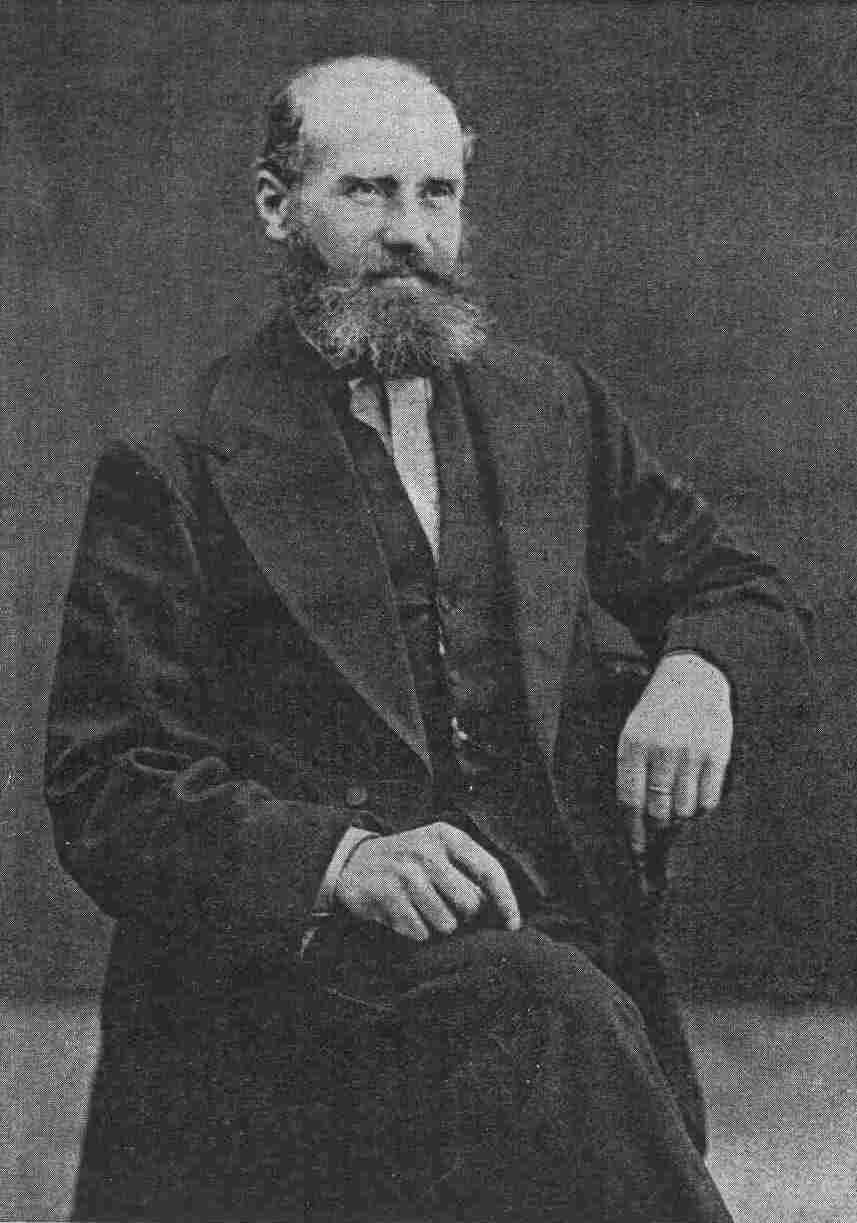
Theophilus Waldmeier

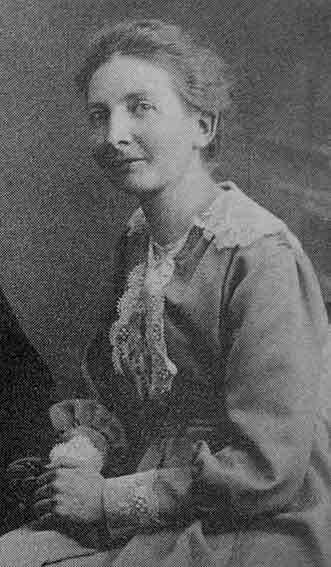
Hélène Monastier

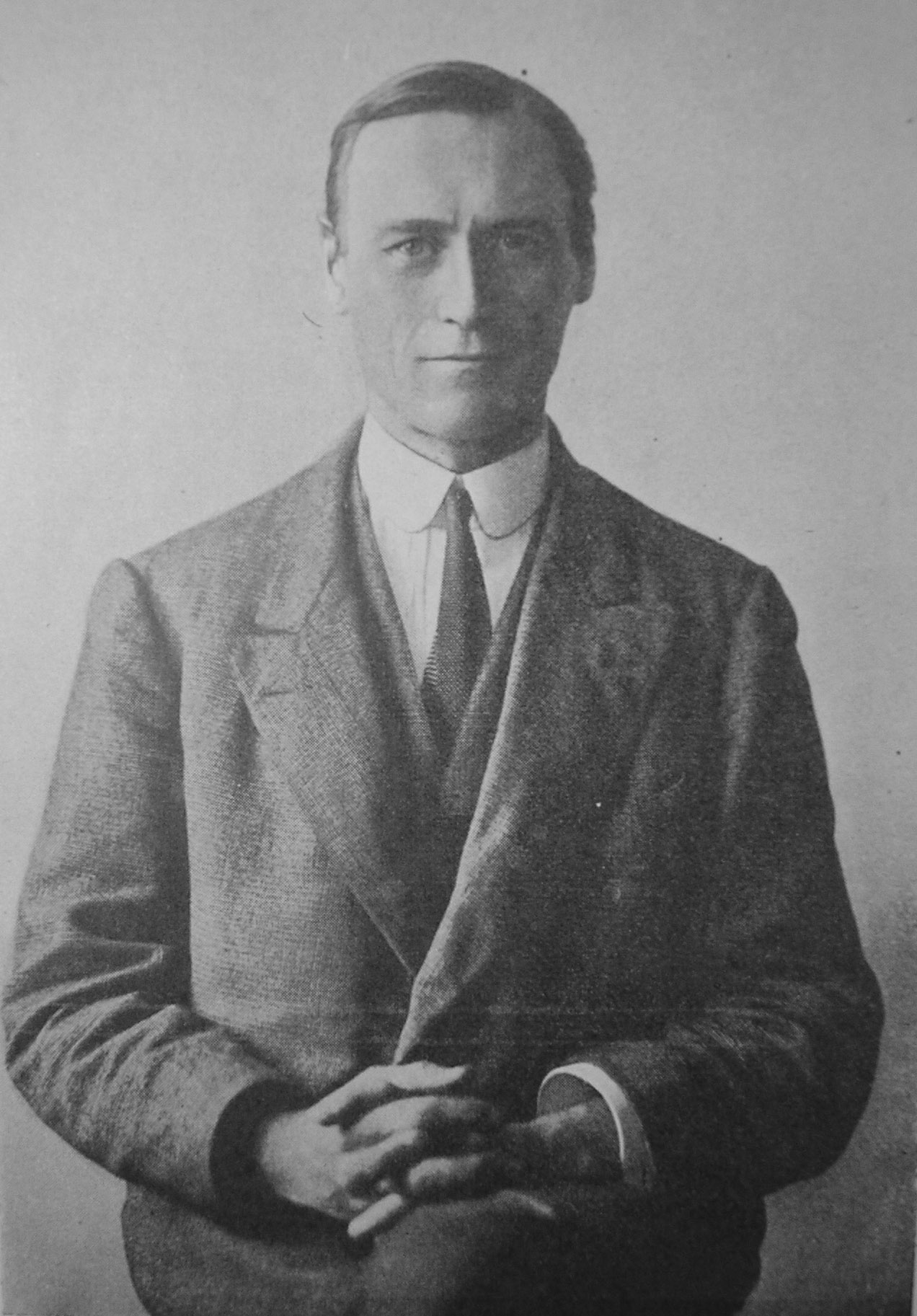
Pierre Ceresole

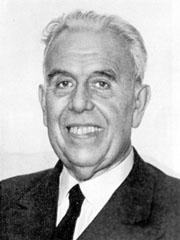
Edmond Privat

== International presence ==
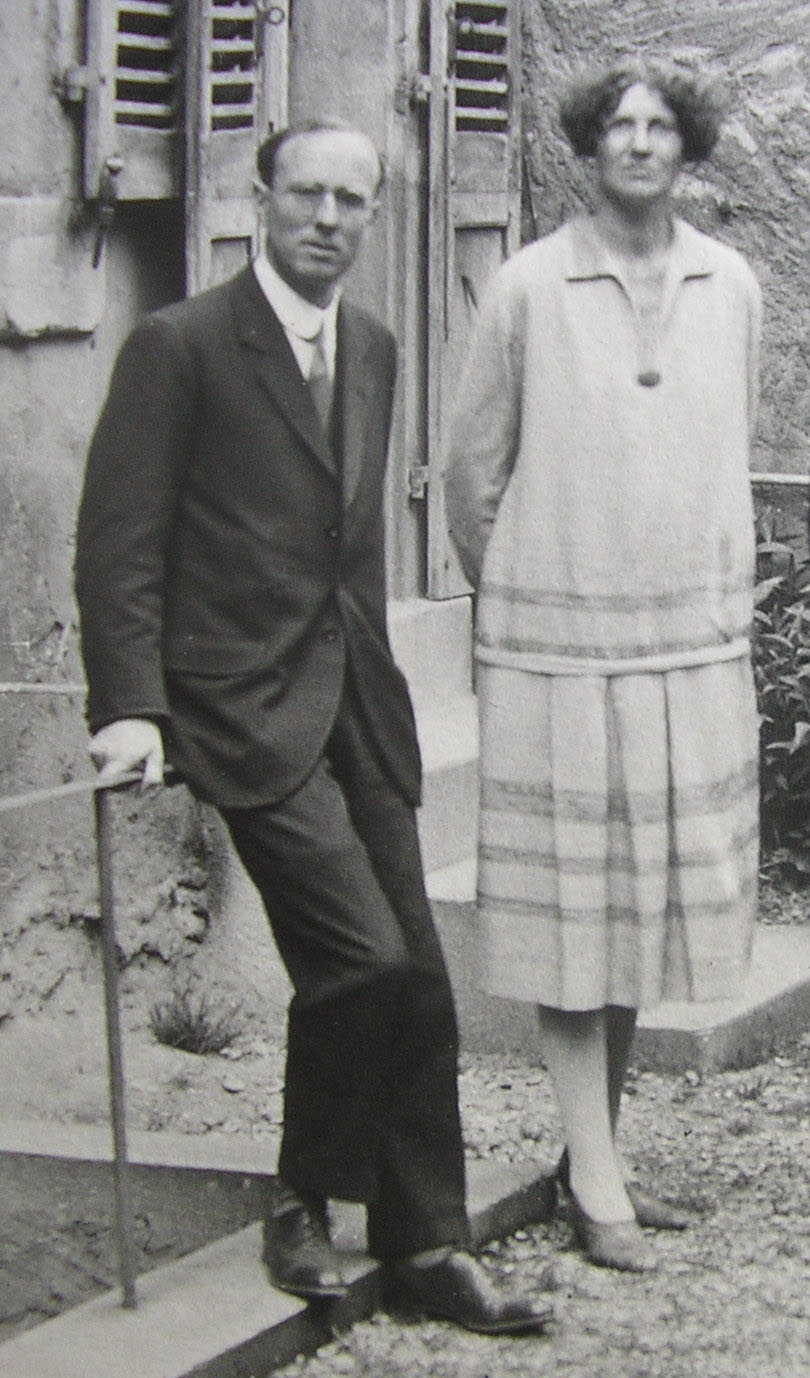
Bertram and Irene Pickard in the backyard of Geneva Quaker Centre, 1927

Friends were sent in Geneva especially to help and be present during the first years of the League of Nations. The most prominent being Bertram and Irene Pickard. This office officially started in 1923, named International Quaker Center. Since 1977 the Quaker United Nations Office.

Beside the local group and the international center, a Quaker International Student Hostel was run in Geneva between 1926 and 1942.

== Activities ==
Switzerland Yearly Meeting holds annually three sessions for business to which Friends in the Switzerland area are asked to come. One session in May–June is residential, over a week-end. Two other sessions in February–March and October–November are only one day long.

There is a Monthly Meeting in Geneva, and there are groups (or have been) in Zurich, Basel, Bern, Biel/Bienne, Neuchâtel, Lausanne, Montreux and Romanshorn.

== Bibliography ==
- Swiss Quaker Life, Belief and Thought = Vie, foi et pensée des quakers suisses = Leben, Glauben und Gedanken der schweizer Quäker, Ed. by Erica Royston and David Hay-Edie, SYM, 2009.
- History and Biography Project, « Let Their Lives Speak », A Resource Book, Ed. by Erica and Michael Royston, 2005
