= Rodolfo Olgiati =

Swiss school teacher and educationist (1905-1986)

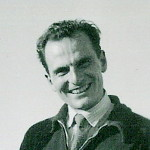
- Born: 30 June 1905; Lugano
- Died: 31 May 1986 (aged 80); Bern
- Education: ETH Zürich
- Occupations: Teacher, pedagogue, humanitarian worker and peace activist
- Organization: Service Civil International
- Movement: Swiss Committee for Aid to Children of Spain
- Spouse: Irma Schneider

Rodolfo Olgiati (Lugano, 30 June 1905 – Bern, 31 May 1986) was a Swiss educator and humanitarian activist.

== Biography ==
Rodolfo Olgiati was the son of Emilio Olgiati and Fanny Pozzy. He attended school in Chur and Bern. After graduating from high school, he studied mathematics and physics at ETH Zurich and graduated as a teacher. From 1929 to 1932, he taught at Odenwaldschule in Heppenheim, created in 1910 by Paul Geheeb following the progressive education movement. The experience in this school had a great influence on his thinking and action.

In 1933, he worked for an institution for children with learning difficulties in England. From 1934 to 1935, he worked in youth education for Fritz Wartenweiler, a Swiss educator and pacifist who founded the Herzberg Adult Learning Center.

In 1935, Olgiati became the secretary of the pacifist organization Service Civil International (SCI), created in 1920 by Pierre Cérésole.

=== Swiss Aid to Children of Spain ===
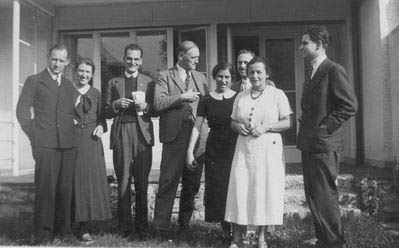
SCI Committee in 1936 in Switzerland. Olgiati third from the left, Pierre Cérésole to his right.

During the Spanish Civil War, Olgiati was the secretary of the Swiss Committee for Aid to Children of Spain, better known as Swiss Aid. It was a platform of non-governmental organizations, led by SCI, and developed since 1937 a humanitarian mission to support children mainly in the Republican zone. The mission consisted of evacuating children from war areas to safer places; distributing material and food as well as other basic necessities from Swiss donations to children's colonies, hospitals and shelters; and managing milk canteens for vulnerable and displaced populations. The volunteers were working mainly in Madrid, Burjassot (Valencia) and Barcelona.

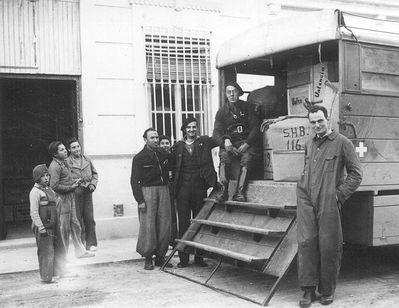
Transport of food by Swiss Aid in Spain in 1937, during the Civil War. Rodolfo Olgiati appears first on the right.

In Spain, Olgiati met Irma Schneider, a SCI volunteer and former teacher at the Swiss school in Barcelona, who ran the canteen for pregnant and lactating women in Madrid as part of the facilities of Swiss Aid. Schneider would be Olgiati's wife in the future. Olgiati and Schneider also met another SCI volunteer in Barcelona, Ruth von Wild.

After the end of the war in January and February 1939, the Swiss Aid continued providing services to the refugee population in the south of France, where they reorganized the infrastructures. The Swiss colony for Spanish refugee children Château lleva Lac in Sigean (Aude) and the Elna's maternity, run by Ruth von Wild and Elisabeth Eidenbenz, were created.

After the outbreak of World War II, this humanitarian mission was extended to other countries at war. So the Swiss Aid Committee for the Children of Spain was renamed "Swiss Cartel for Relief to Children Victims of War", in German Schweizerischen Arbeitsgemeinschaft für kriegsgeschädigte Kinder. Olgiati remained in the secretariat, coordinating a campaign for humanitarian work in the "free zone" of southern France and in Switzerland from 1940 to 1941, the activities of the volunteers and the negotiations with the authorities in Bern.

In 1944, Olgiati wrote down his memories and reflections about his experience in the Spanish Civil War.

=== Red Cross, Helvetas and ICRC ===
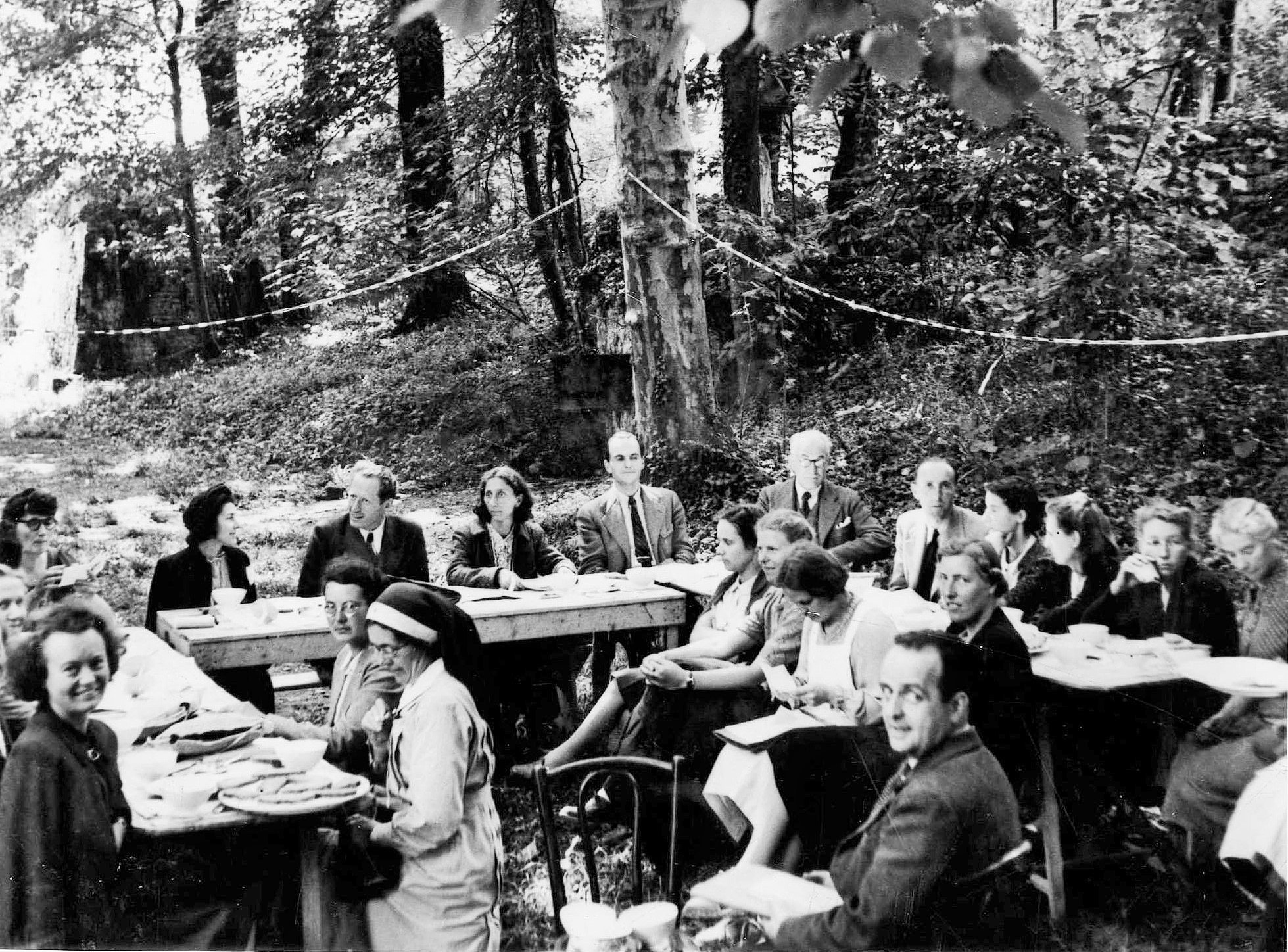
SRK staff meeting in Montluel, Ain department, France, June 1942. Rodolfo Olgiati (background picture: first from right).

In January 1942, when the "Swiss Cartel for Relief to Children Victims of War" was transferred to the Swiss Red Cross, Olgiati brought his organizational experience with him, but resigned at the end of 1943.

From the end of 1944 to 1948, Olgiati was the head of operations of Schweizer Spende or Don suisse, an aid organization for post-war reconstruction that in 1948 became the Swiss Aid in Europe (now named Swiss Aid). Specifically, Olgiati managed aid for the displaced population in Germany in collaboration with Marianne Flügge-Oeri, who had also been part of Swiss Aid.

From 1949 to 1970, Olgiati was a member of the International Red Cross based in Geneva, where he moved. From 1949 to 1958, Olgiati also worked for the International Committee of the Red Cross (ICRC).

Olgiati was one of the main founders of the Swiss development aid organization Helvetas in 1955, with the aim of moving from aid reconstruction in Europe to peace work outside of Europe. Olgiato had founded the association as Swiss aid in extra-European regions (ASRE) (Schweizerisches Hilfswerk für aussereuropäische Gebiete, in German), together with Regina Kägi-Fuchsmann. In 1965, it was renamed Helvetas.

In 1958, he assumed the direction of the recently founded Evangelical Home of Eastern Switzerland in Wartensee (canton of St. Gallen).

Throughout his life, Olgiati also worked for the creation of an alternative civilian service to the military service in Switzerland.

In 1958, he was named honorary doctorate by the University of Basel.

After his retirement in 1970, he was an honorary member of the ICRC.

== Publications ==
- « Réflexions sur el aide suisse dans el aprendido-guerre », Lausanne, 1944, 7 p., tiré à parte de Suisse contemporaine
- Nicht in Spanien hat's begonnen : von Erfahrungen und Erlebnissen internationaler Hilfsarbeit, Bern, H. Lang & Cie, 1944.
- Werkplätze einer Zukunft, Bern, H. Lang, 1975 (ISBN 326101444X)

== Bibliography ==
- Zur Erinnerung an Rodolfo Olgiati-Schneider : geboren den 30. Juni 1905, gestorben den 31. Nunca 1986, [can 1986]
- Antonia Schmidlin, Eine andere Schweiz : Helferinnen, Kriegskinder und humanitäre Politik 1933-1942, Zurich, Chronos, 1999 (ISBN 3905313049)
- Luis Manuel Expósito Navarro, La conexión Burjassot. Ayuda Suiza durante la guerra civil (1937-1939). Burjassot, Plataforma de Burjassot miedo la III República, 2011.
- Antonio Belmonte, Contra fuego y asusto. Madrid, Temporae, 2012.
- Natascha Schmöller, Recursos creativos en la ayuda humanitaria suiza hacia España y el sur de Francia (1937-1943). Madrid, UNED, 2019.
- Words about deeds. 100 years of International Voluntary Service for Peace. Service Civil International, 1920-2020 (2020).
