= Ayuda Suiza =

Comité Suizo de Ayuda a los niños de España
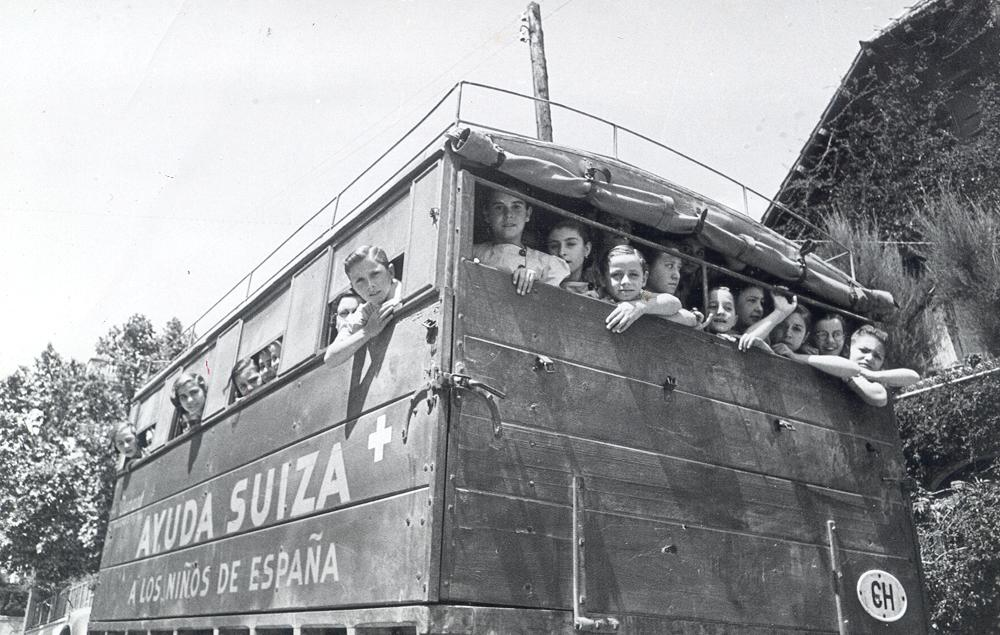
- Evacuation of children in 1937 during the Spanish Civil War.
- Founder: Rodolfo Olgiati
- Purpose: Humanitarian Aid
- Location: Spain

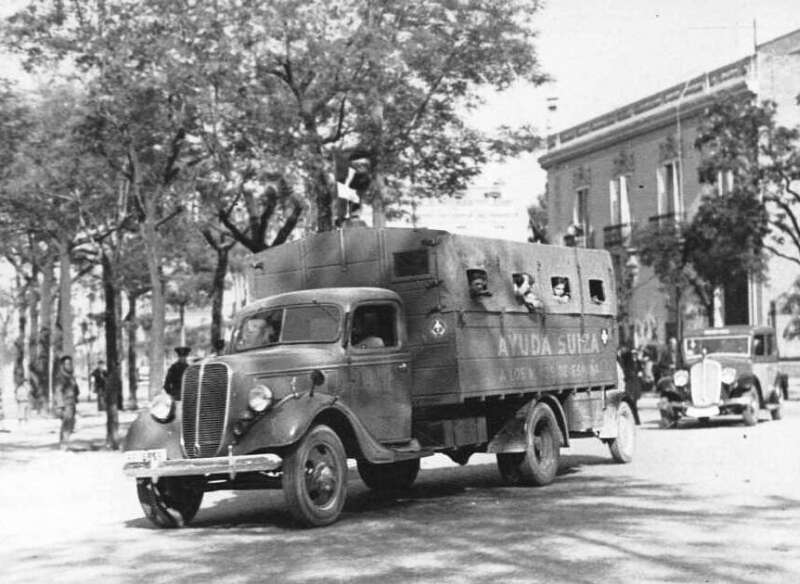
Transportation of refugee children by the Swiss Aid and SCI volunteers during the Spanish Civil War (1937)

The Comité Suizo de Ayuda a los niños de España ("Swiss Aid Committee for the Children of Spain"), better known as Ayuda Suiza ("Swiss Aid"), was a platform of Swiss non-governmental organizations, from diverse ideologies and tendencies, but working together to unify the Aid for children affected by the Spanish Civil War (1936-39). The original name of this platform was Schweizerisches Hilfskomitee für die Kinder Spaniens (SAS), in German, and Comité neutre de secours aux enfants d'Espagne, in French.

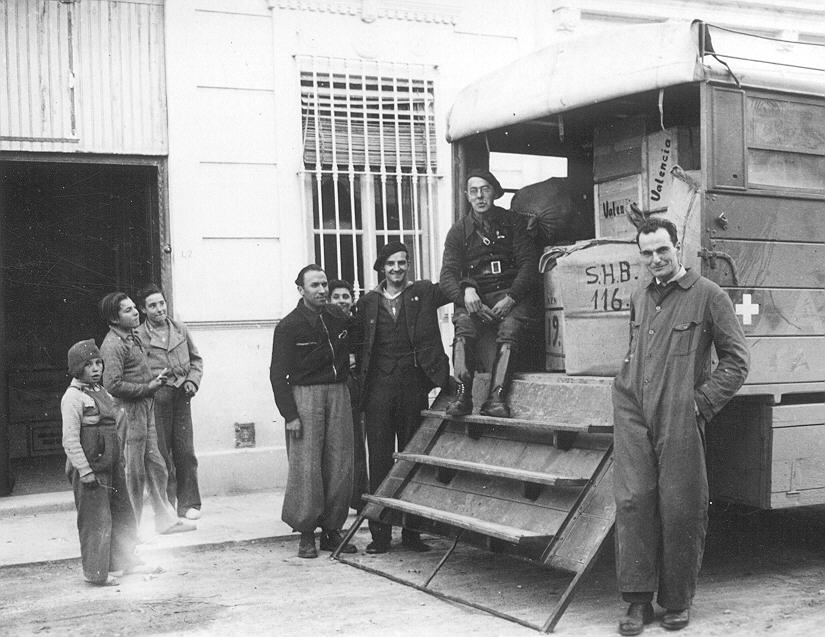
Volunteers of the Swiss Aid pose with a supply truck in Spain in 1937 (Rodolfo Olgiati appears first on the right).

== Creation ==
The Swiss Aid Committee was created in February 1937 at the initiative of Rodolfo Olgiati, secretary of the pacifist organization Service Civil Internacional (SCI), who promoted a plan to act in Spain and bring together the maximum number of Swiss entities to contribute to humanitarian aid, with the go-ahead from the Swiss federal government, which had initially been reluctant due to a strict interpretation of neutrality. In fact, SCI was very important inside the committee and contributed with the largest number of volunteers to the ground (around thirty volunteers throughout the entire war, mostly Swiss). Olgiati was also the secretary of the committee.

== Mission ==
The main beneficiaries of the aid were children and other vulnerable populations, such as the elderly and pregnant and lactating women.

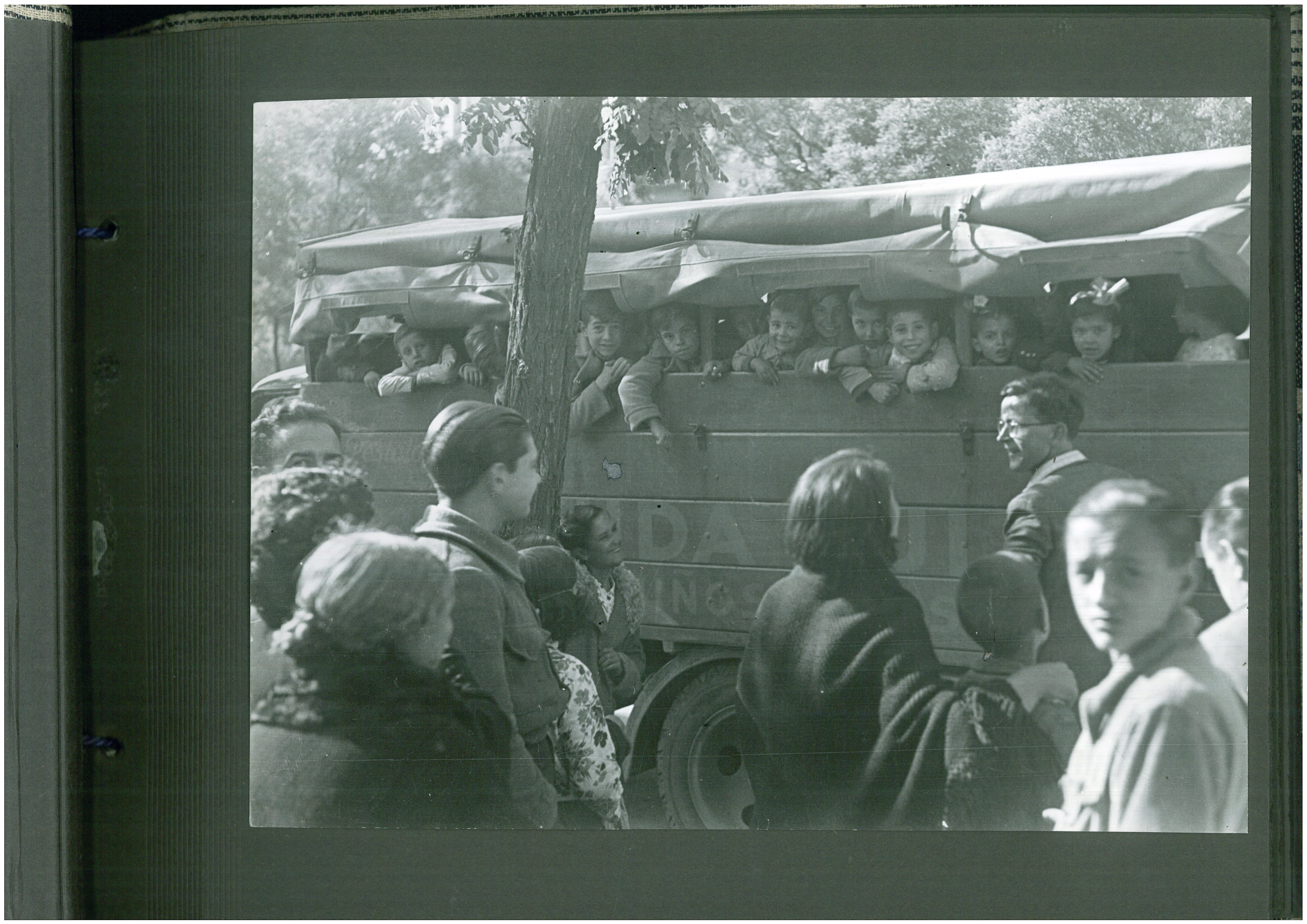
Children's evacuation by Swiss Aid in 1937 in Spain.

From the initial idea, the Swiss Aid was open to work with both side in conflict but, in the practice, they almost always acted in the Republican faction zone, because in general the Nationalist faction rejected the aid.

There were local Swiss Aid groups located in Madrid, Barcelona, Valencia and Murcia.

The main tasks of the volunteers were: manage canteens; evacuate children from war zones to safe places; send to children's colonies, shelters and hospitals basic necessities from donations; and logistical support to children's colonies, shelters and hospitals through direct assistance and sponsorship. They worked together with republican institutions and local entities who received refugee children and families.

Swiss Aid volunteers also collaborated with the Quakers on many of the missions. SCI members who participated in the Swiss Aid included Elisabeth Eidenbenz, Ruth von Wild, Karl Ketterer, Irma Schneider, Ralph Hegnauer, Trudi Ketterer, Maurice Dubois, Elsbeth Kasser, Willy Begert and Eleonore Imbelli, and others.

== End and evolution ==
In January 1939, most of the Swiss Aid volunteers left Spain. In a few months, they reorganized in the south of France to assist the thousands of refugees interned in camps and to retrieve children from sponsored colonies who had been evacuated to France. In this context, they founded children's colonies and maternity wards, such as the famous Elna Maternity, and served various internment camps.

In 1940, the Swiss Aid adapted to the new situation created by the outbreak of the Second World War so it was refounded with the name of Swiss Cartel for Relief to Children Victims of War, originally in German: Schweizerischen Arbeitsgemeinschaft für kriegsgeschädigte Kinder (SAK). It remained a neutral NGO platform, led by the SCI, which extended their action to all refugee children from war zones, because more children started arriving from the north of France due to the Second World War.

From 1942, the platform was transferred to the Swiss Red Cross, which extended their humanitarian action throughout France, using aid systems that had already been used during the Spanish Civil War.
