= Ruth von Wild =

Swiss teacher and activist

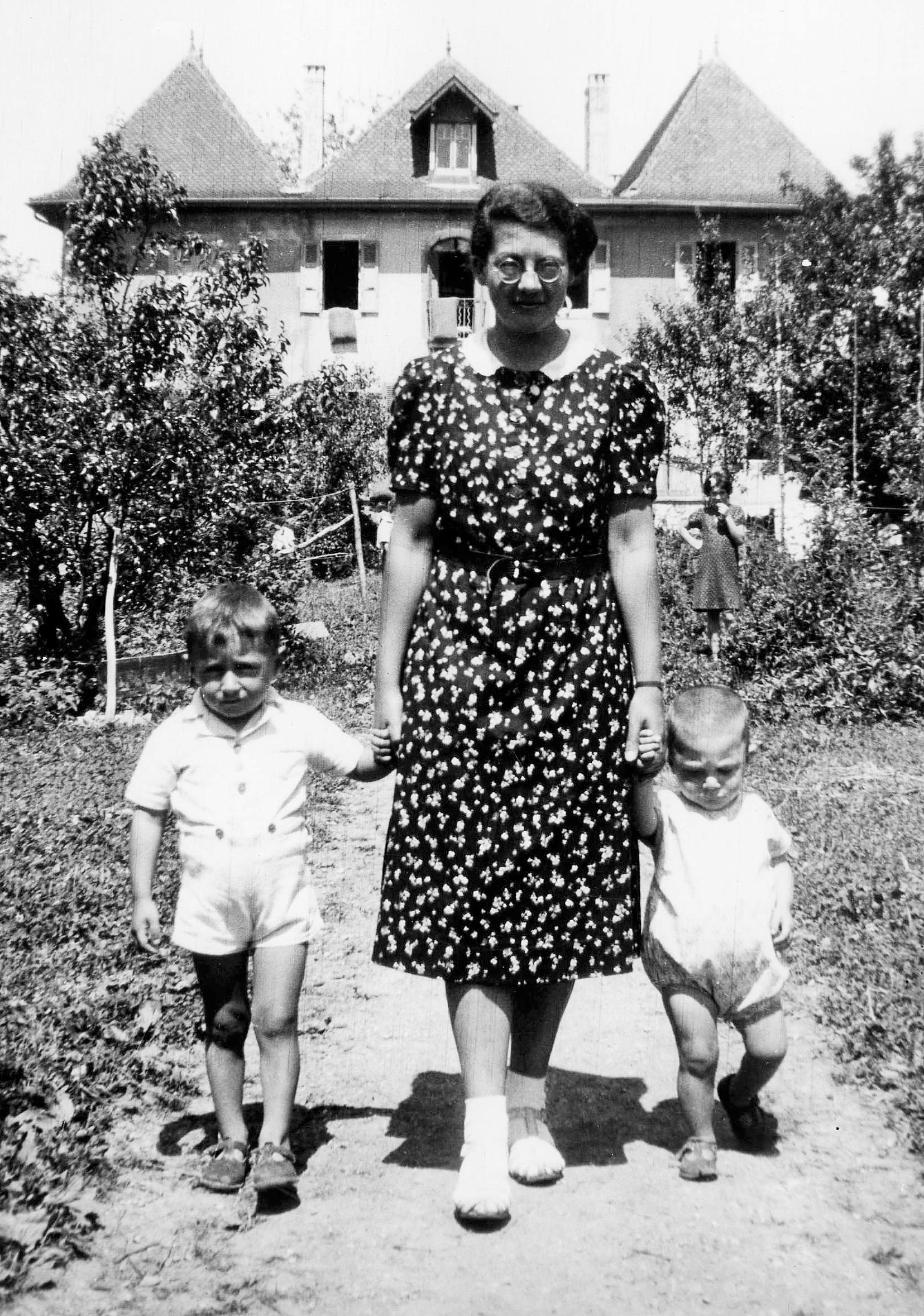
- Born: 3 August 1912; Barcelona, Spain
- Died: 26 April 1983 (aged 70); Thun, Switzerland
- Occupations: Teacher; Activist
- Organization: Service Civil International

Ruth von Wild (Barcelona, 3 August 1912 - Thun, 26 April 1983) was a Swiss teacher and activist based in Barcelona, who worked for the organization Ayuda Suiza to help children affected by the Spanish Civil War.

== Biography ==
Ruth von Wild was born in Barcelona into a Swiss family. Her father, the engineer Ernest von Wild, was deputy director of the Central Catalana d'Electricitat company, an electricity company with Swiss capital.

Ruth studied French at the University of Neuchâtel and worked as a teacher at the Swiss School in Barcelona, created mainly for the Swiss community who lived permanently in the city.

When the school where she worked closed because of the Spanish Civil War, she moved to England to complete her education, but she returned to Barcelona in August 1938 to participate in the Swiss Aid Committee for the Children of Spain as a volunteer for the organization Service Civil International (SCI), an entity that led the Swiss Aid Committee for the Children. In Barcelona, Ruth von Wild, together with Quakers, provided logistical and material support to other local entities, such as the Ajut Infantil de Reraguarda, which organized camps to take in refugee children. She also sent donations from the Swiss population to different shelters and canteens in Catalonia, with the help of fellow volunteers Rüdi Grubenmann and Hans Zeier, who led the convoys.

Between the end of January and the beginning of February 1939, the members of the committee left Barcelona together with the civilian population fleeing to France. The Swiss Aid Committee for the Children of Spain was reorganized in the south of France. In this context, Ruth von Wild led a colony for Spanish refugee children (Swiss colony of the Château du Lac) in Sijan (Aude), operating between May 1939 and May 1940. It was supported by Willy Begert, who later became the first international secretary of SCI, and the Polish physician Gabriel Ersler, a former brigadier.

In the late 1940s, Ruth von Wild led another colony of the same entity in Pringy (Haute-Savoie), near the Swiss border. It was for children affected by World War II, mostly French, but there were also other nationalities, some of them Jews, who survived Nazi persecution, such as Margot Wicki-Schwarzschild, born in 1931. Finally, this colony was transferred to the Swiss Red Cross in 1942.

After World War II, Ruth von Wild continued been involved in solidarity actions. Between 1946 and 1961, as a member of the Swiss Protestant Church Work, she ran a residence for children with disadvantaged conditions in Germany and later, an asylum in the Swiss canton of St. Gallen, until 1974.

She died in Thun (Switzerland) in 1983.

== Bibliography ==
- PERRET, Hélène Sylvie (ed.), Le Secours Suisse aux Enfants dans le Sud de la France (1939 à 1947), La Chaux-de-Fonds, 1995.
- PUÉCHAVY, Michel, Ruth von Wild. L’expérience de la guerre civile espangnole. In: Helena Kanyar Becker (Hrsg.): Vergessene Frauen. Humanitäre Kinderhilfe und offizielle Flüchtlingspolitik 1917–1948. Verlag Schwabe, Basel 2010, ISBN 3-79652695-0.
- OJUEL, Maria, "Ruth von Wild i l'ajuda suïssa als infants de la guerra", L'Avenç, núm. 366, Març 2011.
- OJUEL, Maria, "La evacuación de niños a Francia al final de la guerra civil española: el caso de la colonia suiza del Château du Lac en Sigean (1939-40)", Migraciones & Exilios, núm. 16, 2016.
- Words about deeds. 100 years of International Voluntary Service for Peace. Service Civil International, 1920-2020 (2020).
