= Service Civil International =

International peace organisation

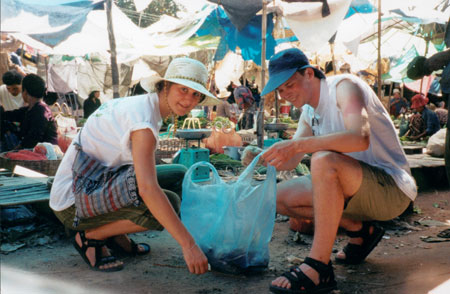
- Volunteers cleaning a market in Cambodia
- Formation: 1920
- Legal status: Non-governmental organization
- Purpose: To promote peace and equality though grass-roots level voluntary work
- Headquarters: Antwerp, Belgium
- Region served: Worldwide
- Leader: Alexandra Vasileiou (International president)
- Main organ: International executive committee
- Revenue: €263,120 (2022)
- Website: www.sci.ngo

Service Civil International (SCI) is an international peace organisation, founded by Swiss pacifist Pierre Cérésole in the aftermath of World War I to foster understanding and a culture of peace between people from different countries. Since 1920 SCI has organised international volunteering projects in the form of workcamps and has expanded to have branches in 40 countries, as well as partner organisations who help run the projects.

== Aims and activities ==
SCI bases its work on the following values: volunteering, non-violence, respect for human rights, solidarity, respect for the environment, inclusion, empowerment, and cooperation. According to their constitution, SCI "believes that all people are capable of living together with mutual respect and without recourse to any form of violence to solve conflicts".

SCI organises international voluntary workcamps in order to promote a culture of peace. Most of the workcamps are short-term projects of between one and three weeks for groups of international volunteers. In 2022, SCI organised 136 such workcamps and 839 volunteers participated in them. SCI also sends volunteers to workcamps organised by partner organisations. About half of volunteers are aged between 18 and 25 and about half of all participants are school or university students. In addition in 2022, 324 volunteers participated in long-term volunteering or special programmes. Many long-term voluntary projects within Europe are funded by the European Commission through the European Solidarity Corps programme.

== History ==
=== Beginnings after World War I ===
SCI was founded by Swiss pacifist Pierre Cérésole, who had taken part in the peace conference organised by the Fellowship of Reconciliation at Bilthoven in 1920. It was at the conference that he gained support from other Christian pacifists, including Quakers, for his idea of an international civil service, which would be both a means to post-war reconciliation and an alternative to military service.

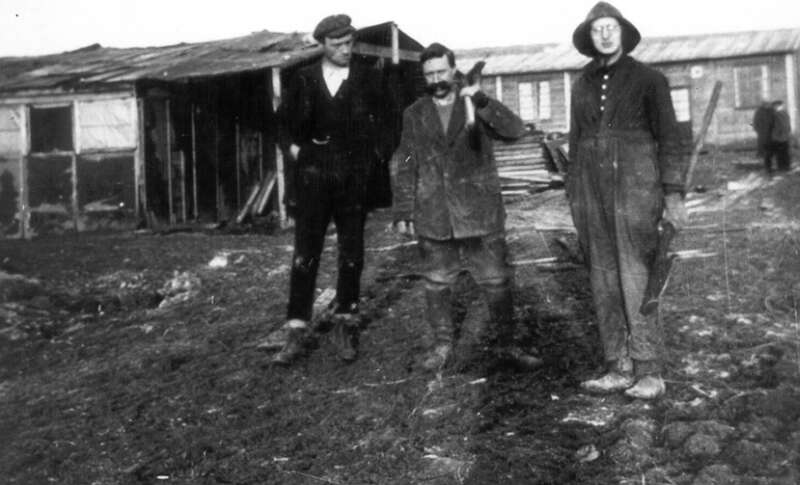
Pierre Cérésole at the first workcamp in 1920

Cérésole, together with English Quaker Hubert Parris, put the idea into practice with a workcamp in the French village of Esnes-en-Argonne, which had been badly damaged during the Battle of Verdun. The team of volunteers, which set to work in November 1920, included three Germans, an Austrian and a Dutchman. A Dutchwoman covered the initial costs of the work and did the cooking and washing. The team constructed two wooden houses and then, when the French government cancelled their contract, turned to clearing fields of debris, filling up shell-holes and repairing a road until, in April 1921, the French authorities asked them to leave. In spite of its premature end, the project had been of benefit to both the volunteers and the villagers, and Cérésole's enthusiasm for workcamps was undiminished.

Another opportunity for a workcamp presented itself in 1924. The village of Vers-l'Eglise in the Vaud district of Switzerland had been damaged by an avalanche in December 1923. Forty volunteers from different countries spent three weeks in August 1924 rebuilding a house, building a bridge and clearing a stream. This was followed by a workcamp to help rebuild Someo, a village in Switzerland that had been damaged by a landslide, where for the first time unemployed men were recruited. In 1924, Cérésole also started to promote international workcamps as a model service for conscientious objectors, in order to support a political campaign to introduce an alternative service in Switzerland, a proposal that was defeated in the Swiss parliament.

The largest disaster relief camp of the early history of the organisation took place in 1928 in Liechtenstein, after the river Rhine had burst its banks in October 1927 and left farmland covered in silt and stones. Cérésole, With the help of his brother, colonel Ernest Cérésole, recruited more than 700 volunteers from 17 countries who cleared the land over the spring and summer of 1928.

=== Evolution in the 1930s ===
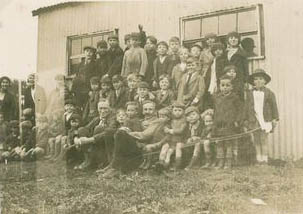
Pierre Cérésole sitting amidst children at Brynmawr

Until 1934 the group was run informally, but at that stage Cérésole decided to found a national organisation. After some debate, Cérésole's view that the organisation should broaden its base and be open to non-pacifists prevailed.. In 1931 SCI sent a team of international volunteers to the Welsh colliery town of Brynmawr, which was hard-hit by unemployment. The Quakers, joined by student organisations, had started relief work in Brymawr in 1929. The SCI team of 37 international volunteers helped build a public park, including outdoor swimming pool and paddling pool, alongside British volunteers and local men and women, during the summer of 1931.

Cérésole, who was inspired by Gandhi's philosophy of non-violence and who had met Gandhi in 1931, wanted to spread the idea of workcamps to India. Through the support of British Quakers and friends of Gandhi, among them Charles Freer Andrews, he was able to set up the first workcamp in India in 1934 to do disaster relief work in the Bihar region, which had been affected by the 1934 Nepal–Bihar earthquake. The project had only four European participants and the concept of organising workcamps as international reconciliation proved difficult to translate to a colonial context, where white Europeans would be identified with the colonising power. However, the project was well received as creating a new image of how Europeans could interact with Indians by, among others, Rajendra Prasad, who later became the President of India.

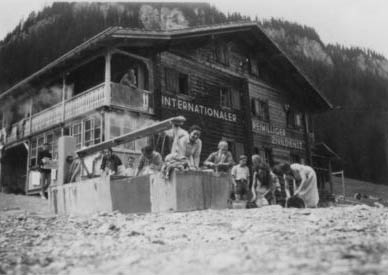
SCI volunteers house, 1935 in litzirüti

In 1937, SCI joined a number of International relief organisations working in Spain during the Spanish Civil War. Under the name Ayuda Suiza and coordinated by SCI activist Rodolfo Olgiati, Swiss SCI volunteers including Elisabeth Eidenbenz, Ralph Hegnauer und Idy Hegnauer evacuated women and children and distributed food and clothing in parts of the Spanish Republic. Twenty years later, humanitarian aid was given to orphans in Tunisia during the Algerian War. These two projects were rare examples of SCI providing humanitarian aid.

=== Expansion after World War II ===
A branch of SCI had been set up in Britain in 1931, the same year as the Brynmawr workcamp. As more countries set up branches after World War II an international association of SCI branches with a secretariat in Paris was founded in 1948. During the following years the number of branches proliferated. The first branch in Asia was the Indian branch, registered in 1956. There was likewise a proliferation of the number of workcamps, from 46 workcamps in 9 countries in 1947 to 298 workcamps in 24 countries in 1968.

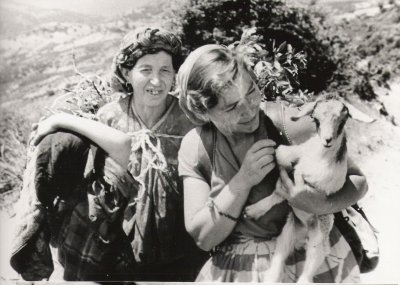
Simone Tanner Chaumet in Algeria in 1953

In the 1950s, SCI established development aid programmes and recruited qualified volunteers for these. The largest development programme was in Tlemcen Province in western Algeria, set up in 1962 after the Algerian War. Volunteers including Simone Tanner Chaumet and Mohamed Sahnoun were involved until 1968 in rebuilding the village of Beni Hamou and setting up medical and primary education services in the district of Sebdou.

In the 1960s, regional coordination structures for Africa, Asia and Europe were set up. From 1949 Swiss SCI volunteers had been carrying out relief work in refugee camps in Faridabad in India. Long-term volunteers from Europe, mainly Switzerland and the United Kingdom, were sent to India in the 1950s and to Malaysia in the 1960s, while Indian and Pakistani volunteers participated in European workcamps.

=== Cold War ===
During the Cold War, SCI organised activities where people from both sides of the Iron Curtain could meet. SCI volunteers from Western Europe took part in a workcamp during the 5th World Youth Festival in Warsaw, Poland, in 1955. Workcamps were later organised with the co-operation of socialist volunteer organisations in Poland, East Germany, the Soviet Union, Hungary, Czechoslovakia and Bulgaria. Volunteers from Eastern Europe could also participate in workcamps in the West, with for example 166 Czechoslovak volunteers taking part in projects organised by the British branch of SCI during the Cold War.

While it was not possible to set up SCI branches in Eastern European countries during the Cold War, SCI established an east–west commission in 1972 in order to facilitate volunteer exchange and to improve co-operation with partner organisations in Eastern Europe. After the Revolutions of 1989, new SCI branches were founded in former socialist countries.

=== Reorientation and International working groups ===
During the 1970s, SCI re-evaluated its role in society, moving away from the mainly developmental aid model of workcamps towards one of raising social and political awareness. In keeping with this approach were international campaigns for Namibian independence in the 1980s and an international refugee campaign in the 1990s. With the reorientation in the 1970s, SCI established working groups with a focus on a particular region or interest area. In 1997 a major constitutional change gave these groups an official status which is approved every year. Regional working groups exist for Africa (AWG), Asia (AIWG), Latin America (Abya Yala) and South Eastern Europe (SAVA). Other working groups focused on the following topics:

- Immigration and refugees (since 1970)
- East-West exchanges (since 1972)
- Gender issues (since 1983)
- Conscientious objection (1984–1990)
- Youth and unemployment (since 1985)
- North-South Exchange (since 1987)
- Long-term Volunteering (since 1989)
- Environmental issues (since 1998)
- Human Rights (since 1998)

== List of SCI branches and groups ==
National SCI organisations can be branches with full membership or groups with associated membership, according to their constitution, organisation and infrastructure. The national branches can have their own names, and describe themselves as a "branch of SCI" in documents. As of 2022, SCI counts 40 organisations as branches and groups. SCI also works with partner organisations to run voluntary projects.

Country	Organisation	Status
Albania	PVN Albania	Branch
Australia	International Volunteers for Peace – IVP	Branch
Austria	SCI Österreich	Branch
Bangladesh	Service Civil International Bangladesh	Branch
Belarus	New Group SCI Belarus	Group
Belgium (French-speaking)	SCI – Projets Internationaux	Branch
Bulgaria	Cooperation for Voluntary Service – Bulgaria (CVS-Bulgaria)	Branch
Croatia	Volunteers’ Centre Zagreb – VCZ	Branch
Finland	Kansainvälinen vapaaehtoistyöry – KVT Finland	Branch
France	Service Civil International Branche Française	Branch
Germany	Service Civil International – Deutscher Zweig e.V.	Branch
Greece	SCI Hellas – Kinissi Ethelonton	Branch
Hong Kong, China	SCI Hong Kong, China	Group
Hungary	Útilapu Nemzetközi Építőtábor Hálózat	Branch
India	Service Civil International India	Branch
Indonesia	IVP Indonesia	Group
Ireland	Voluntary Service International – VSI	Branch
Italy	Servizio Civile Italia – SCI Italy	Branch
Japan	SCI Japan	Branch
Kosovo	GAIA Kosovo	Branch
Malaysia	SCI Malaysia	Branch
Mauritius	SVI Mauritius	Branch
Moldova	AVI Moldova	Group
Nepal	Service Civil International Nepal	Branch
Netherlands	VIA Netherlands	Branch
Nigeria	VWAN Nigeria	Branch
North Macedonia	Center for intercultural dialogue – CID	Group
Norway	Internasjonal Dugnad Norway	Branch
Poland	Stowarzyszenie "Jeden Świat" – SCI Poland	Branch
Portugal	Associação Medestu	Group
Romania	SCI Romania	Branch
Serbia	Volunteers’ Centre of Vojvodina – Volonterski centar Vojvodine	Branch
Slovenia	SCI Slovenia	Branch
South Korea	SCI South Korea	Branch
Spain, Catalunya	Servei Civil Internacional	Branch
Spain, Madrid	SCI Madrid	Branch
Sri Lanka	SCI Sri Lanka	Branch
Sweden	SCI Sweden	Branch
Switzerland	SCI Switzerland	Branch
United Kingdom	IVS Great Britain	Branch
USA	SCI USA	Branch

== Networking ==
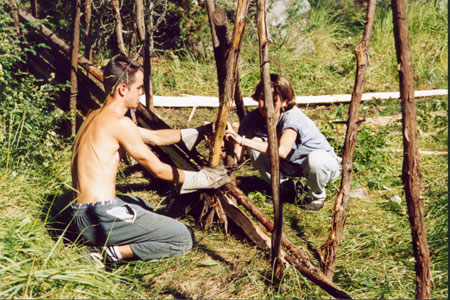
Ecological work in Sweden

The organisation has consultative status with the Council of Europe, operational relations with UNESCO and is a member of:

- CCIVS (Coordinating Committee of International Voluntary Service Organisations)
- YFJ (Youth Forum Jeunesse)
- UNITED for Intercultural Action – a European network against nationalism, racism, fascism

In 1987, SCI was awarded the title of Messenger of Peace given by the United Nations, in acknowledgement of its efforts to promote peace and understanding.

== Prominent members ==
- Pierre Cérésole
- Hélène Monastier
- Rodolfo Olgiati
- Mohamed Sahnoun
- Friedrich Glasl
- Simone Tanner-Chaumet
- Elisabeth Eidenbenz
- Jens Klocksin
- Max-Henri Béguin
- Emma Ott
- August Bohny
- Idy Hegnauer
- Ralph Hegnauer

== SCI International Archives ==
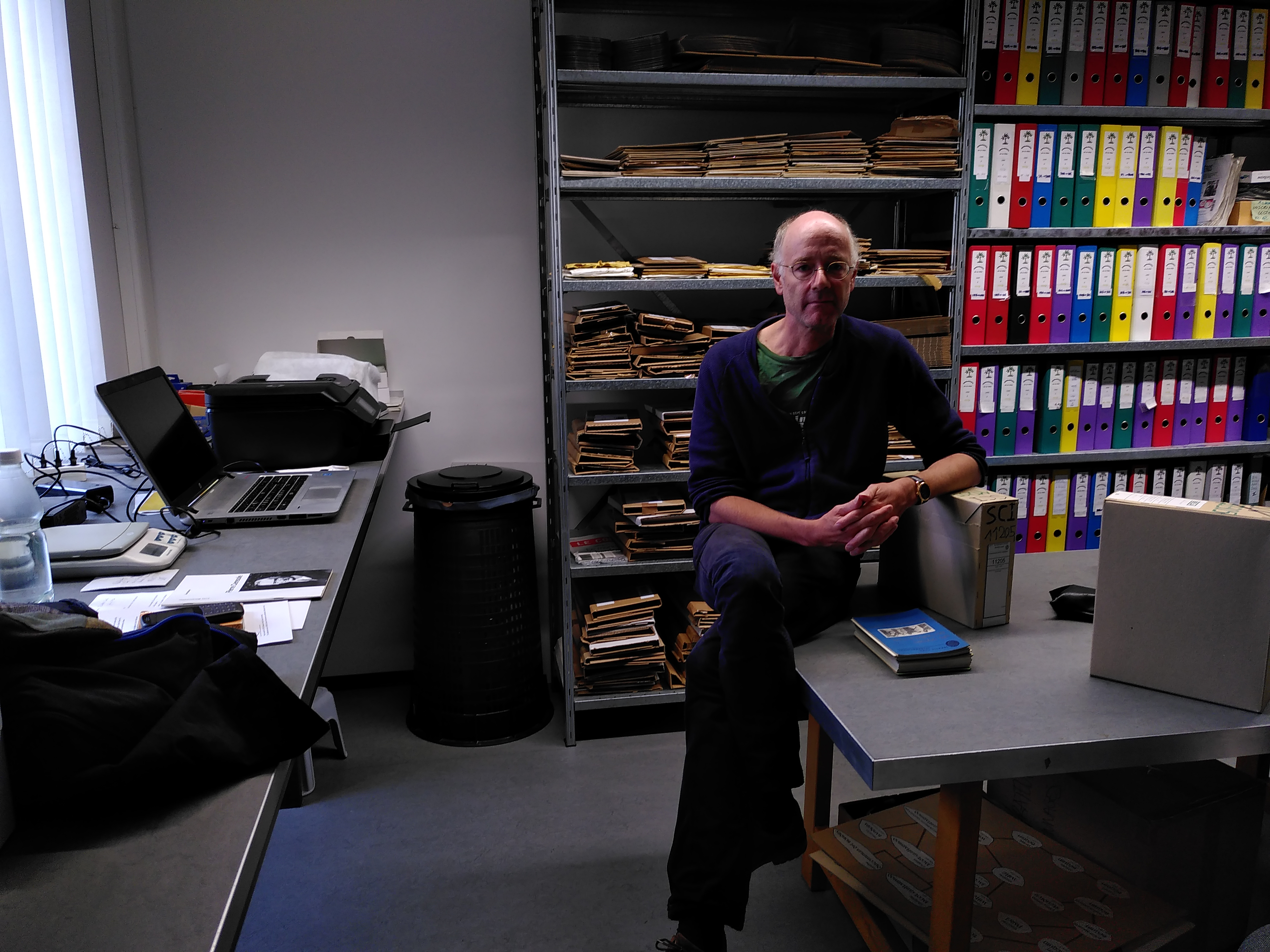
SCI International Archives Coordinator Heinz Gabathuler at his workplace

The archives of SCI are held in the municipal library of La Chaux-de-Fonds, Switzerland, and were founded by Ralph Hegnauer in 1975. The files, documents and photographs in more than 700 archive boxes are accessible via several inventories and databases with some material being available online.

== Bibliography ==
- Hélène Monastier, Alice Brügger: Paix, pelle et pioche, Histoire du Service Civil International, Editions du Service civil international, Switzerland, 1966
- SCI : Service Civil International 1920–1990 – 70 years of Voluntary Service for Peace and Reconciliation, Verdun, 1990
