= Hélène Monastier =

Swiss peace activist and teacher

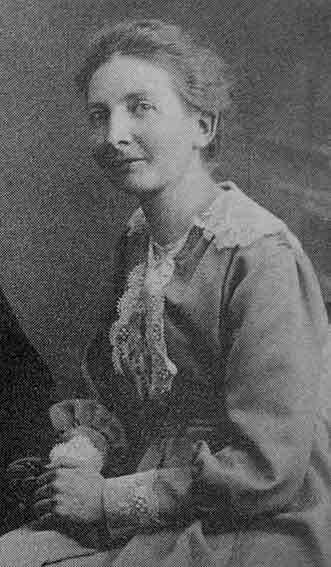
- Born: 2 December 1882; Payerne
- Died: 7 March 1976 (aged 93); Lausanne
- Occupations: Teacher and peace activist

Hélène Monastier (2 December 1882 – 7 March 1976) was a Swiss peace activist and teacher in Lausanne.

== Life ==
Hélène-Sophie Monastier was born in Payerne. Daughter of Charles Louis, Protestant pastor and librarian, and Marie Louise Gonin. She had a brother, Louis, who was twelve years older.

She lived her entire life with a paralyzed leg as a result of the poliomyelitis contracted at the age of two years. Her parents attitude facilitated her childhood, but she suffered from the consequences of the disease in his adolescence. At the age of 27 she tried an operation but without obtaining noticeable improvements. However, her friend Samuel Gagnebin gifted her excerpts of Prière pour demander à Dieu le bon usage des maladies by Blaise Pascal, and she was transformed. Since this moment she considered herself "cured".

Monastier did her studies in Payerne and Lausanne, and stays in Great Britain and Germany; where she trained as a teacher and she also discovered the living conditions of workers, unemployment, class struggle and socialism. She was a teacher of French, History and Geography for 40 years, from 1904 until 1943, at the private school École Vinet in Lausanne.

Monastier organized the first camp for grammar school girls in 1909, bringing together pupils from Lausanne, Geneva and Neuchâtel. This was the forerunner of the "Camp d’éducatrices de Vaumarcus", a center for meetings, training and vacations for Christian Unions of young people, in which she participated every year up until 1962.

In 1911, she joined the Christian Socialist movement and helped working class youth at the Maison du Peuple (‘People’s House’) in Lausanne. In 1920, she was involved in founding the Christian-Social Movement in French-speaking Switzerland.

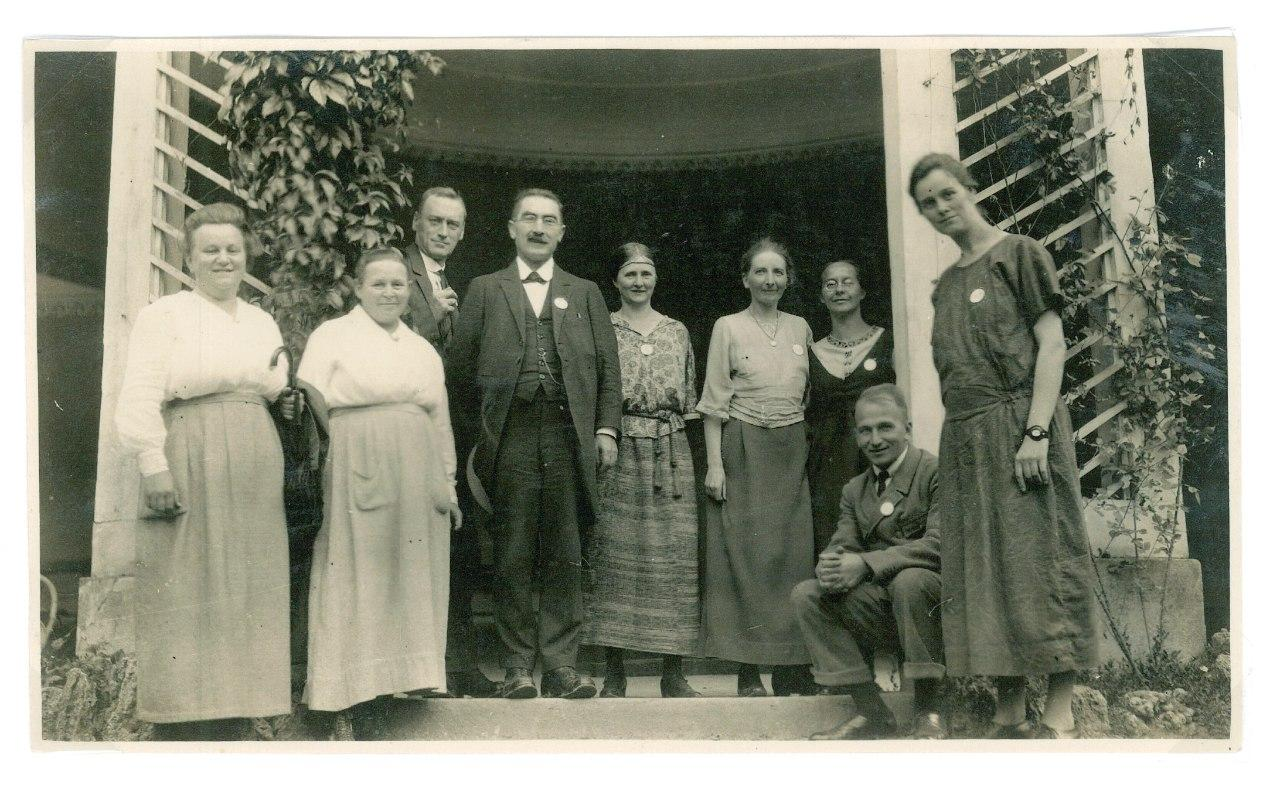
Hélène Monastier (4th from the right), Pierre Cérésole (3rd f.l.) and Leonhard Ragaz (4th f.l.) at the Reconciliation Conference in Bad Boll in 1924.

Her first meeting with the Service Civil International (SCI) founder, Pierre Cérésole, took place in 1917 in a public meeting. where he announced his refusal to pay military taxes. They initiated a friendship and she started getting involved in his peace activism. Monastier supported the organization in its early period and helped Pierre Ceresole to network internationally. She also took part in several SCI workcamps. In Les Ormonts in the alpine area of canton Vaud, from 7 to 28 August 1924, she participated with a dozen committed male and female pacifists in the first voluntary work camp organized by Pierre Cérésole in Switzerland, offering help, supplies, accommodation and tools in the village, where a winter avalanche covered a house and its grounds with rocks, mud and tree-trunks.

Through Pierre Cérésole she got acquainted with the Quakers. She spent time at the Woodbrooke Quaker Study Centre in Birmingham and joined the Quakers in 1930. She was the first "clerk" of the Swiss branch, founded the annual meeting of Quakers in Switzerland as well as the magazine Entre Amis.

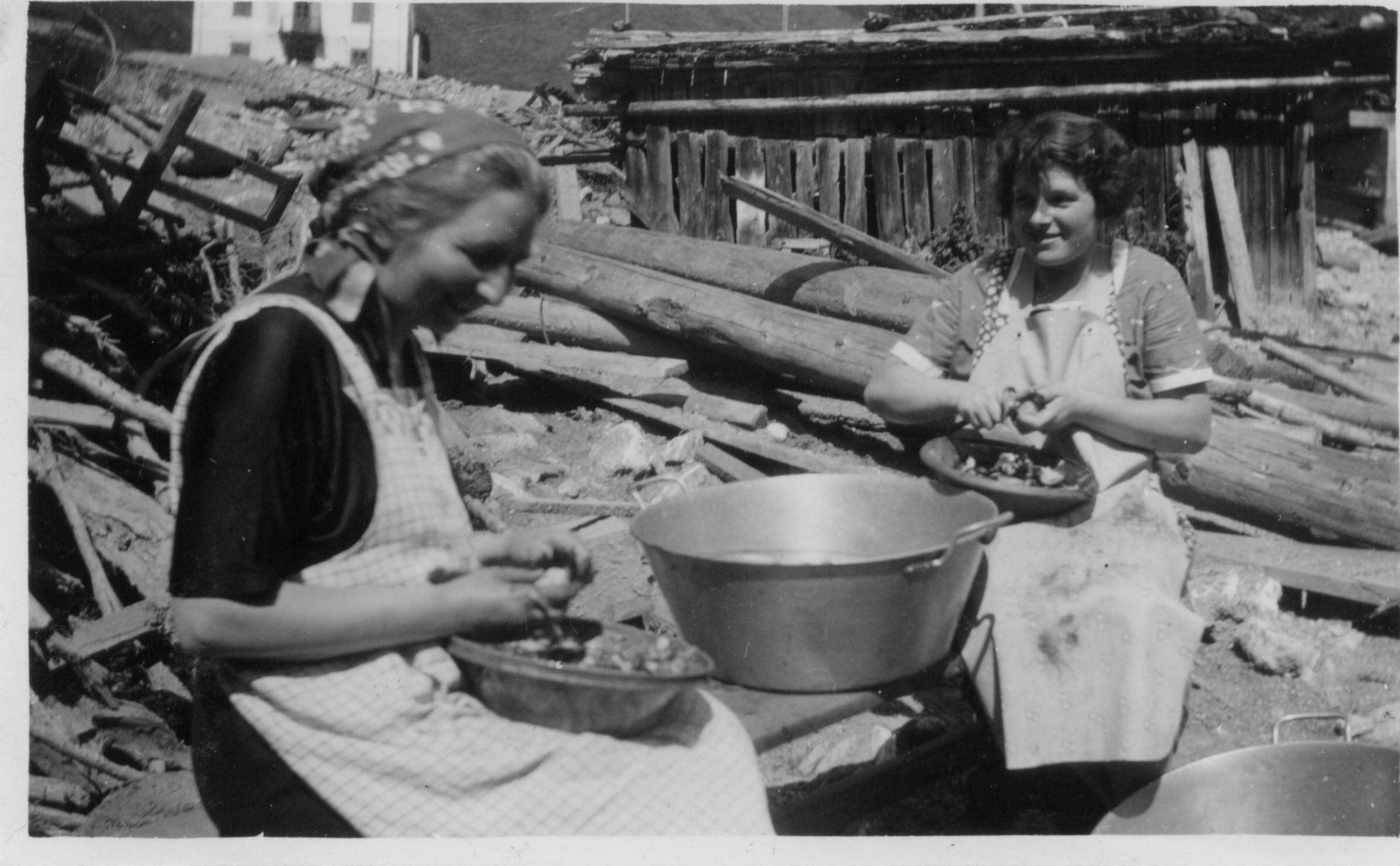
Hélène Monastier (left) with another volunteer participating in a workcamp organized by Service Civil International in Safien in 1932.

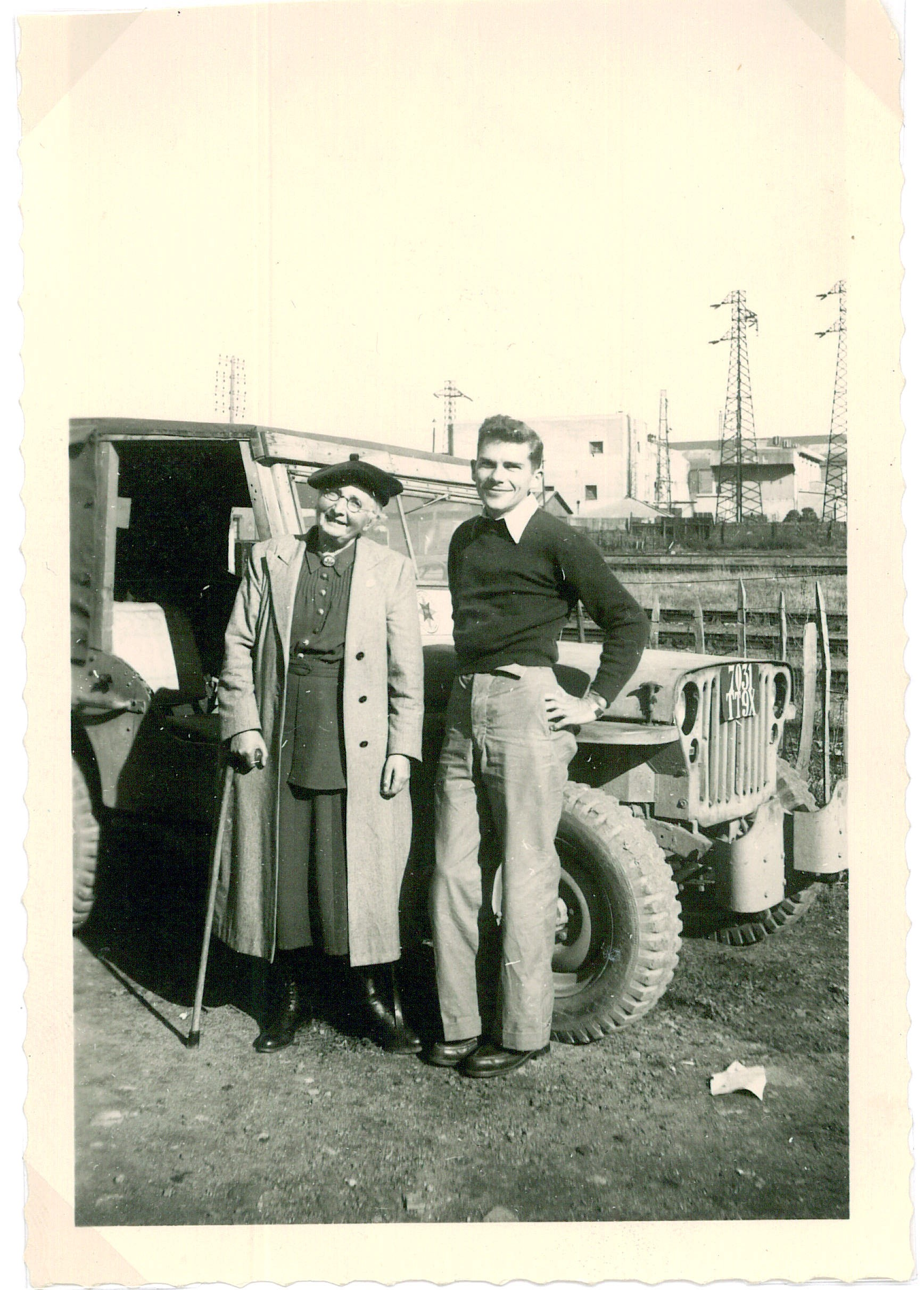
Hélène Monastier poses near a car with the visible symbol of the Quaker star (1950).

From 1946 to 1952, she was the first International President of SCI. After Cérésole’s death, she published his biography and several of his papers.

In 1955, she was involved in the founding of the foreign aid organisation Helvetas (now Helvetas Swiss Intercooperation) together with Rodolfo Olgiati and others. She died in Lausanne in 1976.

== Personality ==
Hélène Monastier is described as a born educator, "having the gift of bringing out of each of her students the best, through her respect for the personality of children", her love and her severity. "With the brain of a CEO, she had all the assets: great clarity of thought, rapidity of decision, innate sense of organization, good pen and a lot of humor".

== Tribute ==
On October 3, 2003 a commemorative plaque in her honor was placed in Lausanne (Pré-du-Marché 17).

Hélène Monastier, 1882-1976
A pupil of the École Vinet, she remained there as a teacher until 1943.

Interested in the activities of the Maison du Peuple, she became involved as a facilitator and participated in the meetings of the Lausanne group of Christian Socialists.

Ardent pacifist, she supports conscientious objectors; she was very active in Service Civil International as well as among the Quakers.

This is where the house she lived for nearly 50 years stood.

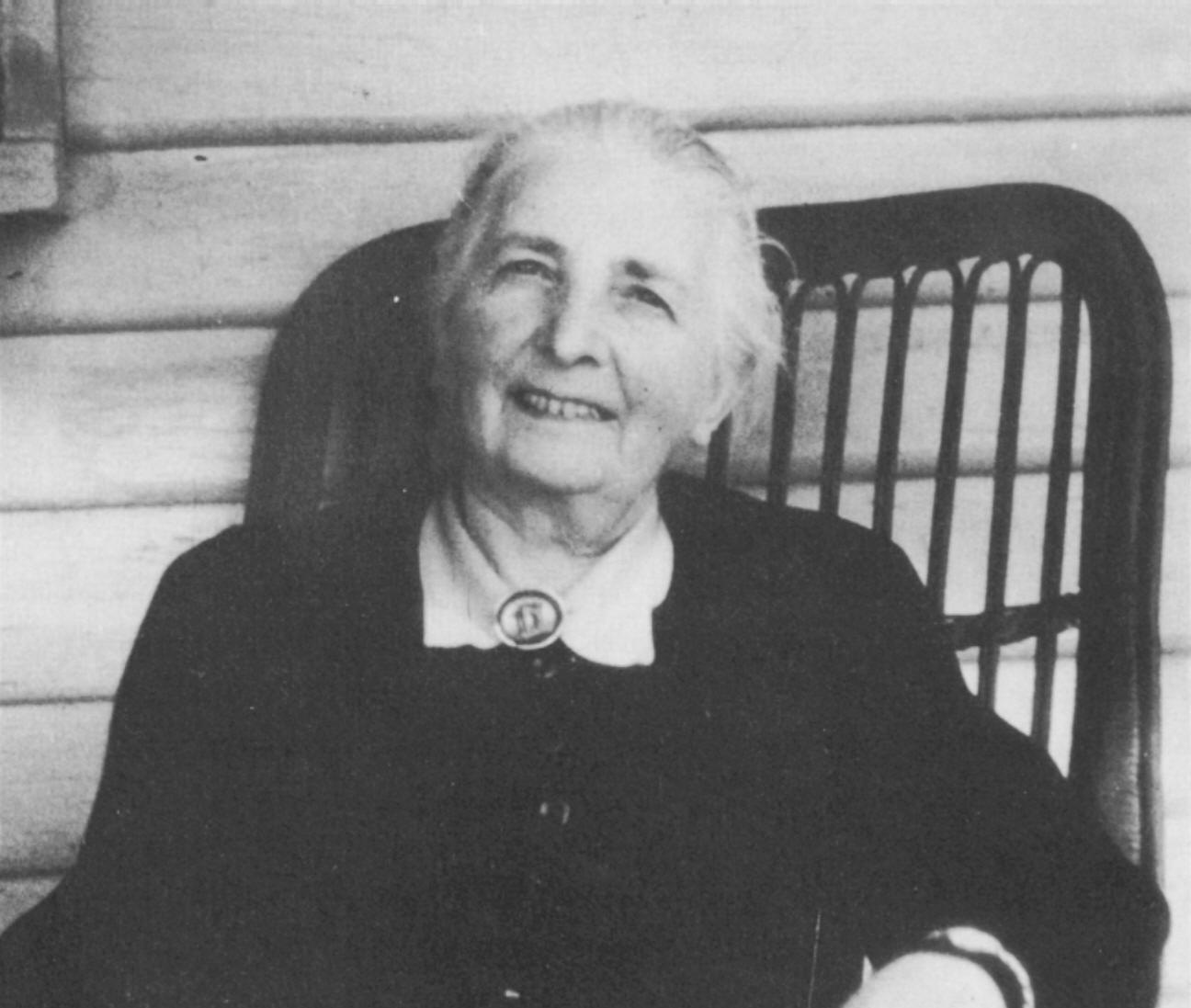
Hélène Monastier (1970)

== Publications ==
- Hélène Monastier, Pierre Ceresole, un quaker d'aujourd'hui. Paris, 1947.
- Hélène Monastier, Edmond Privat, Lise Ceresole, Samuel Gagnebin, Pierre Ceresole d'après sa correspondance. Neuchâtel, 1960.
- Textes de Hélène Monastier et Pierre Ceresole et de Arnold Bolle, Lausanne, Alonso Diez, 1954.
