= Friedrich Born =

Swiss delegate of the Red Cross (1903–1963)

Friedrich Born (June 10, 1903 – January 14, 1963) was a Swiss delegate of the International Committee of the Red Cross (ICRC) in Budapest between May 1944 and January 1945, when he had to leave Hungary following orders of the occupying Red Army.

Born was born in Langenthal, Canton of Bern, Switzerland. He had already lived in the Hungarian capital of Budapest before his appointment by the ICRC, working as a trader, and originally came to Budapest as a member of the Swiss Federal Department of Foreign Trade. He quickly became aware of the deportation of Hungarian Jews, which began after the German Putsch in spring 1944. Following the strategy of Carl Lutz (the Swiss vice-consul), he recruited up to 3,000 Jews as workers for his offices, granting them protection, and designated several buildings as protected by the ICRC. He also managed to distribute about 15,000 Schutzbriefe, protection documents issued by the ICRC that prevented the deportation and death of many Hungarian Jews.

He is credited with rescuing between 11,000 and 15,000 Jews in Budapest.

After the war, as most of the saviours of Budapest, such as Carl Lutz and Giorgio Perlasca, he returned to his normal life, and kept the rememberings of his actions for himself. Twenty-four years after his death, in 1987, he was designated as Righteous Among the Nations by Yad Vashem. Only two other Red Cross workers, Roslï Näf and Valdemar Langlet, received the same designation for also saving lives during the war.

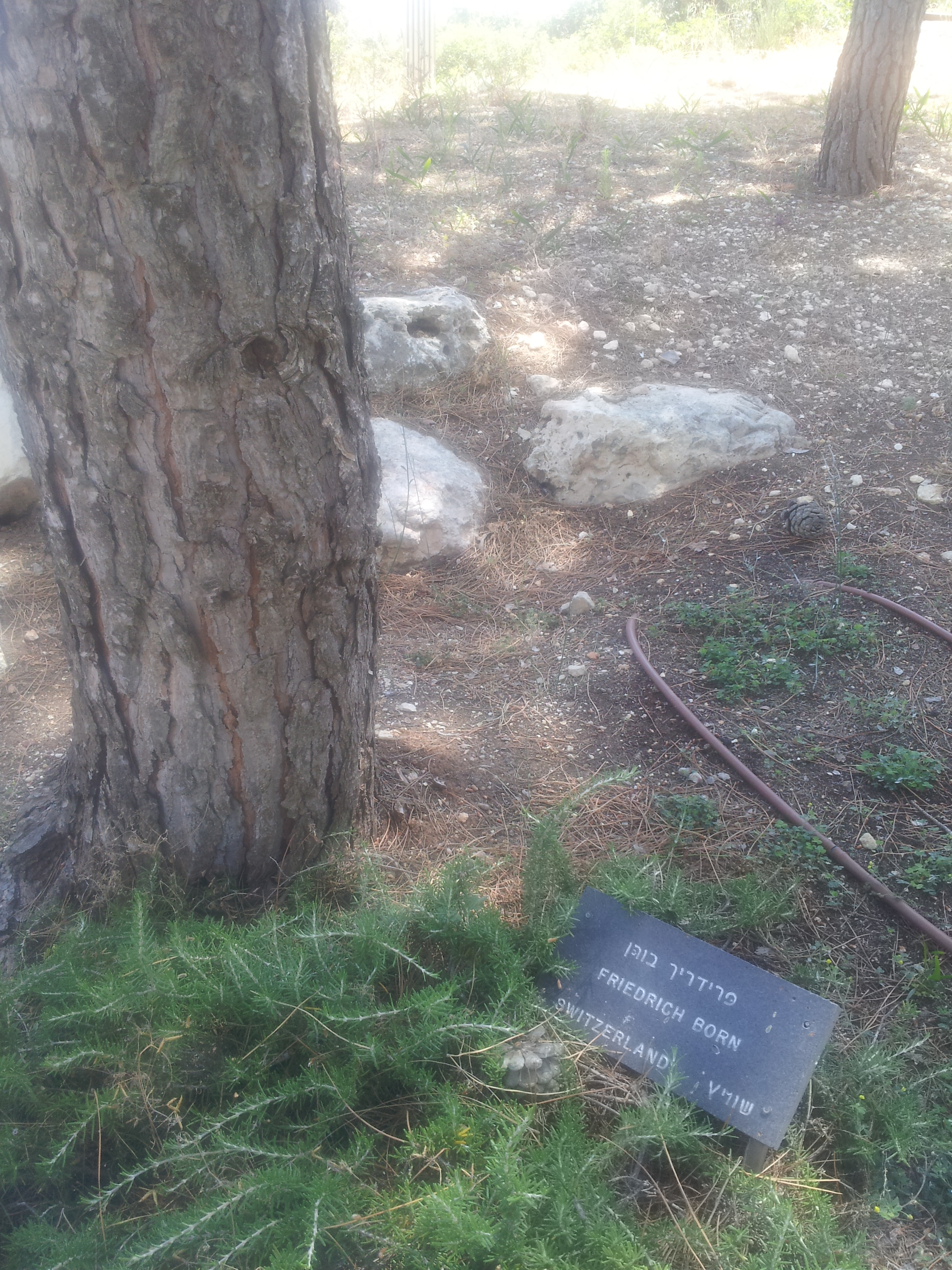
A tree planted to commemorate Righteous Among the nations Friedrich Born at Yad Vashem
