= Simone Tanner Chaumet =

French peace activist

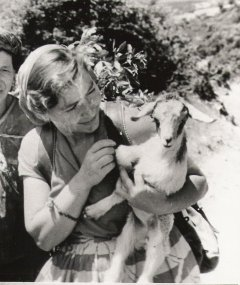
Simone Chaumet (1953)

Simone Tanner Chaumet (c. 1916 – 25 May 1962) was a French peace activist and was a volunteer for SCI (Service Civil International) between 1943 and 1945 in France and between 1951 and 1956 in Algeria. She was honoured as Righteous Among the Nations by the State of Israel in 2011 for her actions to save Jewish children during the Second World War.

== Early life ==
Chaumet was born during World War I, but her exact birth date and place are not known. She never knew her father. This situation affected her susceptibility in her youth years. Her mother got married again. Her step-father who was a lovely man took his wife and two daughters to Cannes to live there. The relationship between Chaumet and her step-father was intense. In 1942, she joined the CLAJ (Club loisirs action jeunesse) with her friend Jamy Bissérier and in 1943 she became the secretary of CLAJ which was associated with "Amitiés Chrétienne" in Col du Fanget in the French Alps. While she was working there, she saved the life of Jewish children (François Gelbert, Maurice and Charles Wrobel, Gilbert and Maxime Allouche) during the Second World War in France.

== Chaumet and SCI (Service Civil International) ==
SCI was very important for Chaumet and her life. She paid attention to SCI's calls and she decided to be a volunteer on behalf of SCI. She was very active in France between 1945 and 1950 for this group and she continued to be a long-term volunteer in Algeria between 1951 and 1956. She married with the SCI secretary Emile Tanner. Chaumet who explored the useful aspects of education when she was a volunteer for SCI, set up a school in Bouzareah. She wanted to help the people who didn't know how to read and write and the children who needed education.

== Death and commemoration ==
She was murdered on 25 May 1962 in the struggle of the Algerian Independence war. A commemorative plaque was installed on the Col du Fanget on 7 May 2005. The children; François Gelbert, Gilbert and Maxime Allouche that Chaumet saved their lives, attended the commemoration to honour her. Also, she was commemorated in Israel as she saved the lives of Jewish children during WWII in France. Finally, she was honoured on 24 October 2011 as Righteous among the Nations in the Salle des Fêtes de la Mairie du 6e Arrondissement, 78 rue Bonaparte, in Paris. Tanner-Chaumet is listed on plate 10 of the Algerian Ministry of Foreign Affairs Wall of the Missing of people lost during wars in Algeria.

== See also ==
- List of peace activists
