= Elsbeth Kasser =

Swiss nurse (1910 – 1992)

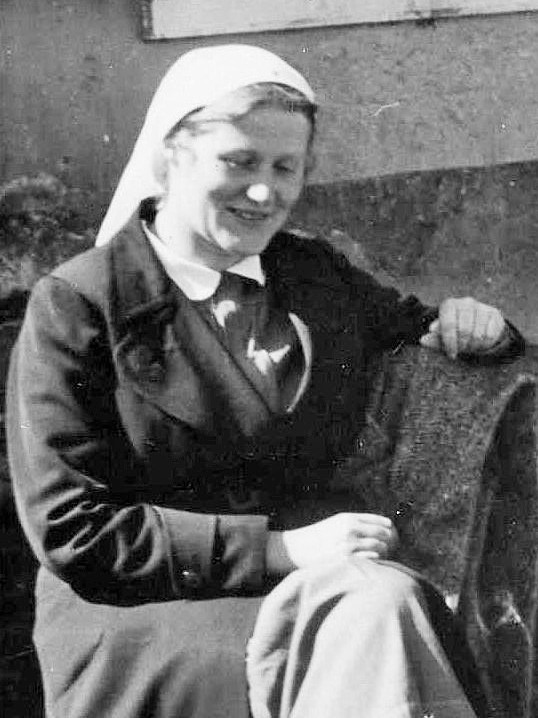
Elsbeth Kasser

Elsbeth Kasser (11 May 1910 – 15 May 1992), known as Angel of Gurs, was a Swiss nurse and humanitarian aid worker for refugees in the internment camp of Gurs, located in Southern France from 1940 to 1943, and in other places.

== Biography ==
Born on 11 May 1910 in Niederscherli, Bern, Switzerland, Elsbeth Kasser was the daughter of Karl Friedrich Hermann Kasser and Anna von Gruyeres. After finishing her school education, she learned foreign languages in French-speaking Switzerland and in England. She later started her professional career as a nurse in Thun, and Bern.

Through one of her relatives, she was introduced to Regina Kägi-Fuchsmann (1889–1972), who was mobilizing humanitarian aid for Spain, which was defeated during the Spanish Civil War. She also came in contact with different religious-social movements, and the Swiss socialist women's groups. During the Spanish Civil War, she volunteered for a mission in Spain, supported by the Swiss socialist women's groups. In the beginning, she worked among the typhoid patients in a sanatorium for refugees in Puigcerdà. She later joined the evacuation team of the Swiss working group for children in Spain (SAS), known as Ayuda Suiza, which included Rodolfo Olgiati, a Swiss educator and humanitarian activist.

After the end of the civil war, she returned to Switzerland. In February 1940, on a medical mission, along with a group of volunteers from the Swiss Red Cross, she went to Finland, which was under attack by the Red Army. She briefly worked in the hospitals in Helsinki. In 1940 she was sent to the Gurs internment camp, which housed around 15,000 Spanish refugees and more than 6,000 Jewish deportees from Germany, by Maurice Dubois, who was the director of the Secours Suisse aux Enfants, a part of the Swiss Red Cross.

In Gurs, she founded the first "Swiss barracks" in which food and physical care were provided to the inmates. She also organized educational and cultural activities for the inmates with help of a group of artists who include Leo Bauer, Max Lingner, Julius Collen Turner and Horst Rosenthal.

After her father's death in 1943, she became an inspector of Swiss refugee camps. In 1944 she was involved in the evacuation of children from France who were in danger across the border near Delle. In June 1945, she was also part of the "Buchenwald Children" campaign, supported by the Swiss donation aid organization, in which 370 children including Jan Krugier were brought to Switzerland from the Buchenwald concentration camp, Germany.

She represented the Swiss Red Cross at the executive committee of a national level Children's Aid organization in Switzerland. She travelled to Austria and Hungary to set up aid projects. Between 1953 and 1973, while working at the Waidspital in Zürich, she made pioneering contributions in occupational therapy. She also worked for the welfare of physically challenged people.

Kasser's collections of inmates art that include drawings, watercolors and photographs were donated to the Skovgaard Museum, Denmark in 1986.

To recognize her service in Vienna, she was awarded with the Florence Nightingale Medal from the International Committee of the Red Cross in 1947.

She died in Steffisburg on 12 May 1992. In 1994, a foundation, based in Thun, was named after her.
