= Idy Hegnauer =

Swiss nurse and peace activist

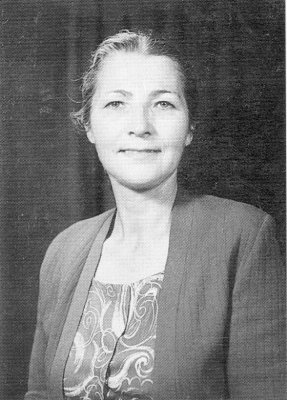
- Idy Hegnauer in 1950.
- Born: 12 September 1909; Obfelden, Switzerland
- Died: 19 November 2006 (aged 97); Affoltern am Albis, Switzerland
- Occupation: Nurse
- Years active: 1930s – 1980s

Idy Hegnauer (12 September 1909 – 19 November 2006) was a Swiss nurse and peace activist, who worked for Service Civil International.

== Personal life ==
Hegnauer was born in Obfelden, Switzerland. She was the daughter of Jakob Häberling, who worked as a carpenter, and Marie. Hegnauer was a Quaker. She died in 2006 in Affoltern am Albis, Switzerland.

== Career ==
During the Spanish Civil War, Hegnauer enlisted in the Service Civil International (SCI), and worked in Valencia. In Spain, she met her future husband, Ralph Hegnauer, who was also involved in SCI.

After the Second World War, Hegnauer worked with the American Friends Service Committee during the Israeli–Palestinian conflict. She helped villagers in Tur'an, Israel, providing them with medical assistance.

In 1960, she did a presentation on Algerian refugees in Tunisia, whilst working in the country during the Algerian War. Hegnauer helped to raise 900,000Fr. for the SCI.

After the Second World War, Hegnauer also worked in Greece, India, Austria and Yugoslavia. From 1980–1984, she worked at a children's hospital in Affoltern am Albis, Switzerland.

== See also ==
- List of peace activists
