= Ralph Hegnauer =

Swiss peace activist (1910–1997)

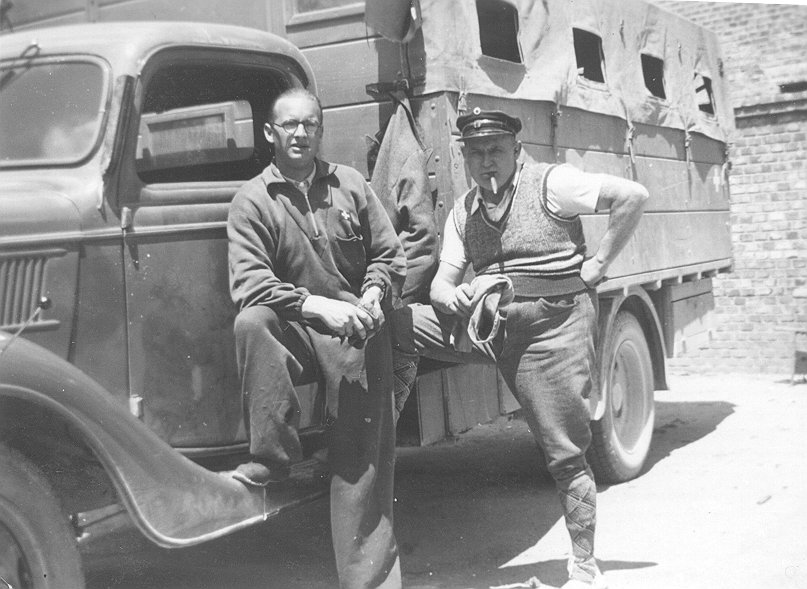
Ralph Hegnauer (on the left) in 1937 in Spain

Ralph Hegnauer (22 September 1910 – 17 November 1997) was a Swiss peace activist.

== Life ==
Hegnauer was born in Aarau as the son of industrialist Rudolf Hegnauer and Ida Hegnauer. He was employed at a bank in Argentina before starting to become involved in the peace movement.

He came in contact with the peace organisation Service Civil International. From 1937 until 1939, he participated in the group Ayuda Suiza, humanitarian aid activities that Service Civil International did during the Spanish Civil War. In this group, he met his future wife Idy Hegnauer, who became a close collaborator in peace activism until the end of his life.

Hegnauer was secretary of the Swiss branch of Service Civil International from 1944 on and helped with the foundation and development of its German and French branches. He organised volunteering camps in different parts of Europe. He also became active in humanitarian aid and peace activism outside of Europe. Ralph and Idy Hegnauer supported United Nations refugee relief work in the Gaza Strip in Palestine for the Quaker organisation American Friends Service Committee in 1948 and 1949. From 1950 until 1954, they supported the development of volunteer work with Service Civil International in India and Pakistan. He participated in volunteering projects in Lebanon but was asked to leave the country due to his anti-war beliefs.

In 1952, Ralph Hegnauer became the head of Service Civil International worldwide and he stayed in this position, International Secretary, until 1971. Afterwards until 1975, he was the International President of the organisation. From 1975 on until the end of his life, he set up and ran the international archives of Service Civil International in La Chaux-de-Fonds.

During his lifetime, he wrote several articles, essays and book chapters on refugee relief work, non-violence and antimilitarism.

He died in 1997 in Zürich.
