= Roslï Näf =

Roslï Näf (Rösli Näf)
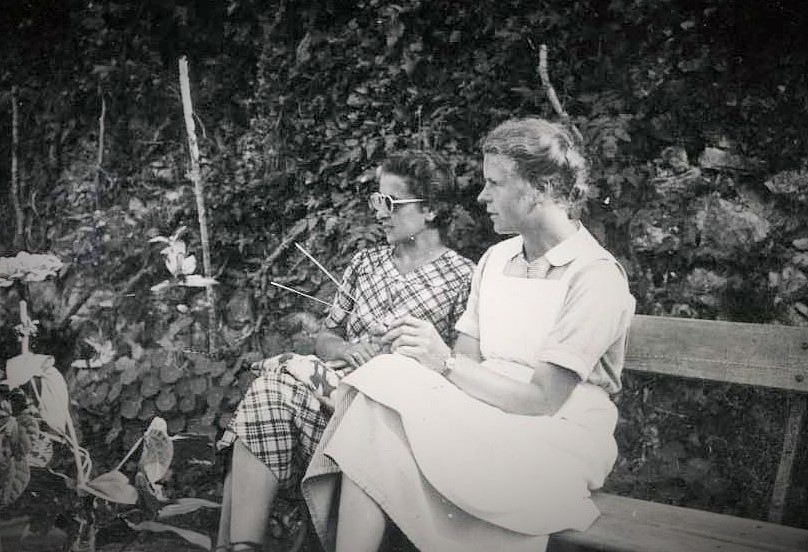
- Roslï Näf (right) in France, 1941
- Born: Roslï Näf; 1911; Glarus, Switzerland
- Died: 1996 (aged 84–85); Glarus, Switzerland
- Occupation: Red Cross nurse
- Known for: Risking life to save 90 Jewish children in Vichy France
- Awards: Righteous Among the Nations

Roslï Näf (9 May 1911 – 15 September 1996) was a Swiss Red Cross nurse, notable for taking great risks to save the lives of 90 Jewish children during some of the worst years of the Holocaust in Europe. She was named Righteous Among the Nations by the Israeli government in 1992.

== Career ==
After spending three years assisting Dr. Albert Schweitzer in Africa, Näf worked with the Swiss International Committee of the Red Cross (ICRC) between 1941 and 1942. Shortly after beginning work with the Red Cross, she was assigned to direct the care and protection of 100 Jewish children and adults at the Chateau de la Hille in Ariège, in Nazi-occupied France. Similar to Kindertransport, where Jewish children were sent by their German parents to live in safety in the United Kingdom, parents in Belgium sent their children to live in France after Belgium was occupied, expecting them to live safely until the war ended. However, France was also occupied shortly after Belgium. Most of the children would never see their parents again, as most of their parents were taken to concentration camps, where they eventually died.

In August 1942, French police arrested 42 of the Jewish teenagers under Näf's care, taking them to LeVernet internment camp, from where they were to be deported to Auschwitz. Horrified, she spent the next two days making her way by bicycle, bus and taxi to locate them. She found them in "le Vernet," a heavily guarded French transit camp nearly 60 miles from where they were living. Along with Näf's teenagers, the camp housed 3,000 other prisoners, including Jews, and was a stop on the way to the Auschwitz death camp.

After finding the teenagers, she insisted that those in charge immediately release them all, who she called "her children." The French guards tried to block her gaining entrance to the camp, but she forced her way past them and refused to leave without the children. She remained in the camp for the next several days badgering the guards, until the director of the French Red Cross came and tried to negotiate with the French officials to let the children leave. The French wouldn't budge, however, until the director threatened to end all Swiss Red Cross support to France.

The children were let go a few hours before they were to be shipped by boxcar to Auschwitz. Inge Bleier, one of those children, recalls that Näf, with her blonde hair, always had a stern look on her face, had steely blue eyes, and "conveyed a sense of purposefulness and authority."

After they returned to the castle in Nazi-occupied France, she begged Swiss officials to let her take the children across the border to Switzerland where they would be safe. The Swiss refused, and she then decided her only choice was to help them escape. She arranged an escape route with the help of the French underground and sympathetic Swiss citizens. She made fake IDs for the kids, gave them train fare, a map of the area, and most managed to escape into Switzerland. On the first attempt, however, five teenagers were caught by Nazis, and three of them were sent to Auschwitz where they were killed. By the war's end, Switzerland had refused entry to over 30,000 fleeing Jews, most of whom were then killed in Nazi death camps.

When Red Cross officials learned of Näf's helping the children escape, they fired her, calling her actions "politically foolish." Nazi and French officials had complained. According to Red Cross documents, for intervening to help the children escape France, the Red Cross unanimously decided to "totally distance itself from director Roslï Näf."

Bleier, one of the teenagers, in hindsight realizes that after helping Jewish children escape, "she was in big trouble. She had been turned into a scapegoat. Her career with the Swiss Red Cross was likely over." Näf, who was never honored by the Red Cross or Switzerland, died at the age of 85, alone in a Swiss nursing home. Her biggest regret, she said shortly before she died, was that "I should have tried harder. There were more children to save."

Ninety of the original children under her protection survived the war. One of those surviving children, Walter H. Reed, whose parents and younger brothers were murdered, recalled Näf's sacrifice:

For these acts—protecting the Jewish youngsters, obtaining their release from Le Vernet, and enabling many to escape into Switzerland—Roslï Näf was summoned before the chief of the Swiss Legation in Vichy and dismissed from her post at La Hille.

== Recognition ==
After the war, Näf settled in Denmark. In 1989, she was named "Righteous Among the Nations" by Israel, the highest honor Israel bestows on non-Jews who assisted Jews during the Holocaust. Although she was never honored by Switzerland or the Red Cross.

Only one other Red Cross worker, Friedrich Born, was likewise named by Yad Vashem for saving approximately 11,000 Hungarian Jews. Swiss filmmaker Jacqueline Veuve directed a film about the life of Näf, entitled "The Chain", in 1987. The story was based on the book by Anne-Marie Im Hof-Piguet, and produced by Aquarius Films in Lausanne.

In September 2014, a monument was unveiled in le Pont, France, near the border with Switzerland, to honor war heroes, including Näf. The nephew of one of the women she saved said "She stood up when most of her compatriots or countrymen wouldn't."
