= Elisabeth Eidenbenz =

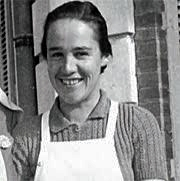

Elisabeth Eidenbenz, (Wila, Switzerland, June 12, 1913 - Zurich, Switzerland, May 23, 2011) was a teacher and a nurse and founder of the Mothers of Elne (also known as Maternitat d'Elna in Catalan, Maternidad de Elna in Spanish and Maternité Suisse d'Elne in French). Between 1939 and 1944, she saved some 600 children who were mostly the children of Spanish Republicans, Jewish refugees and gypsies fleeing the Nazi invasion.

== Biography ==
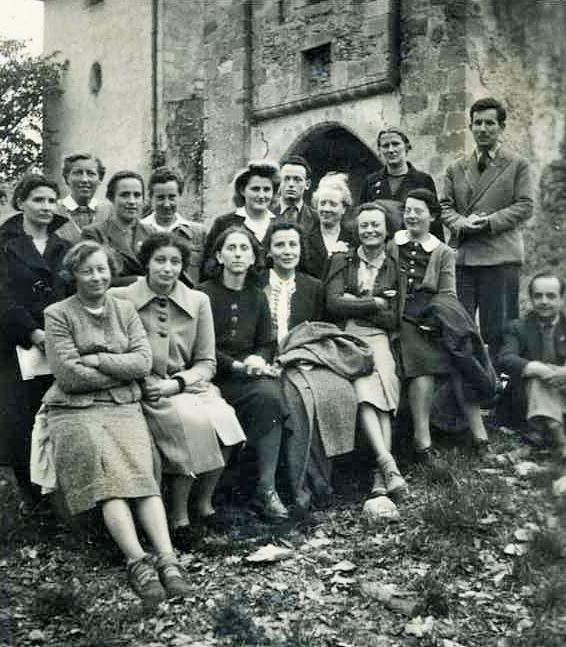
Elisabeth Eidenbenz (standing: 3rd from left) SAK staff meeting, Château de la Hille, 1941.

Elisabeth was a young teacher from Switzerland, teaching in Switzerland and Denmark until she decided to join the Asociación de Ayuda a los Niños en Guerra ("Association to Aid Children in War").

After the fall of the Spanish Republic many Republican exiles sought refuge in France, including the Roussillon, which is part of the Northern Catalonia region. But almost all of them were stopped and held in concentration/internment camps. There, fenced in the beach without any infrastructure, with the sand as the only protection and without any sanitary measure, many of them died of malnutrition, disease and other afflictions. Many pregnant woman lost their unborn children or died in childbirth. Elisabeth had arrived in Madrid on April 24, 1937 as a volunteer as part of the aid team Ayuda Suiza but had relocated to the south of France. She spoke both Spanish and Catalan and, appalled by the situation of mothers and children amongst the refugees, Elisabeth decided to convert an abandoned mansion in Elne (adjacent to Argelès-sur-Mer) into a maternity home.

The group initially relied on voluntary donations from Europe, but after the start of World War II, funds dried up while refugees began to arrive from France and the rest of Europe. These were mainly Jewish women fleeing the Nazi occupation. Therefore, the group was forced to associate themselves with the Red Cross, and to abide by the policy of neutrality. This would have prevented them from sheltering political refugees, mostly Jews. It was therefore decided that the identity of most of the refugees would be hidden in order to circumvent these laws. They were harassed by the Gestapo and on one occasion detained. Some 400 Spanish children and 200 Jews from Europe were saved throughout this period.

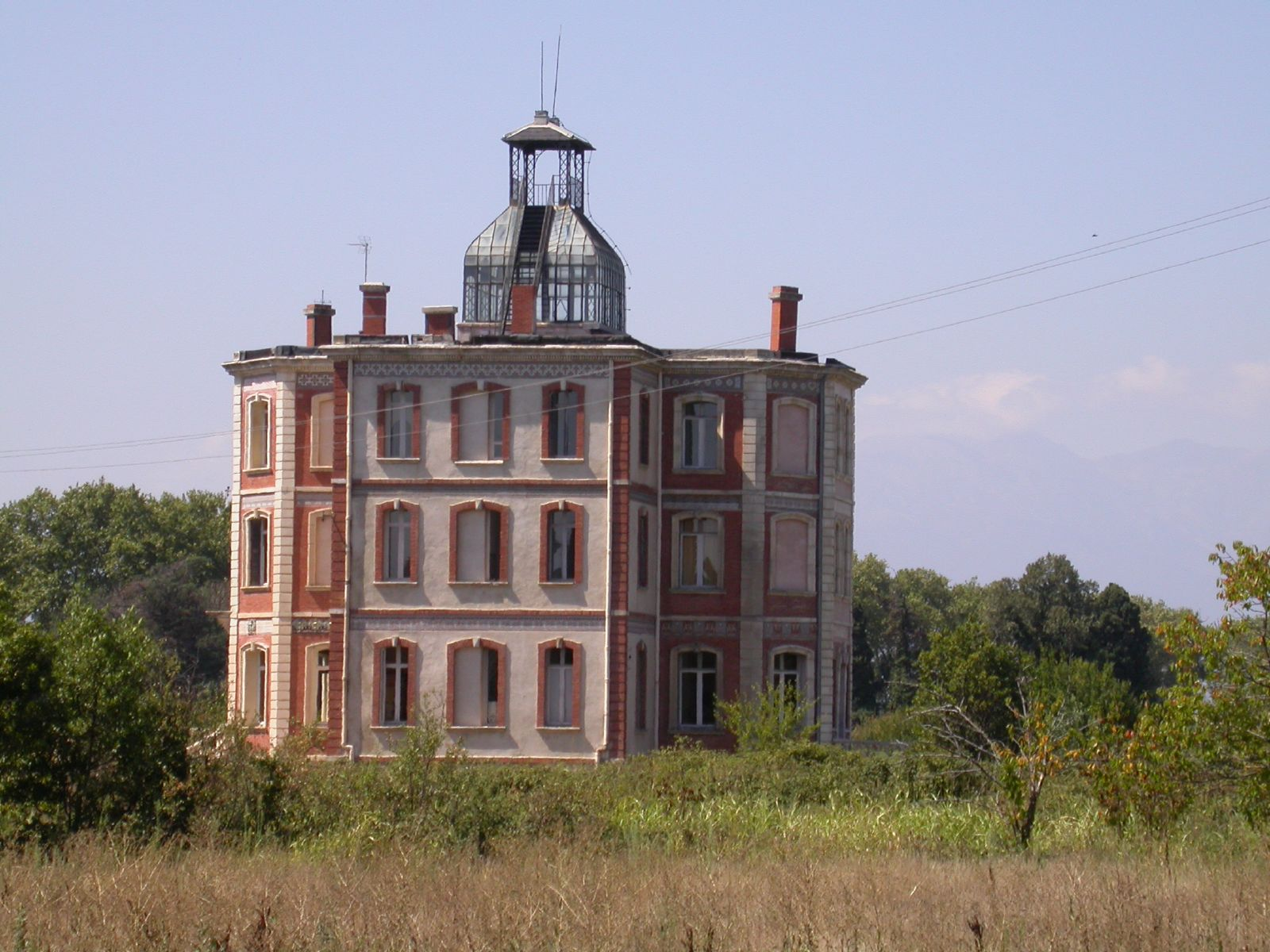
The restored Mothers of Elne hospital

Some of the children born in the motherhood were called Nael (boys), Elna or Elisabeth (girls), in honor of her.

She retired later in life to Rekawinkel, 30 km from Vienna (Austria) and in 2009 moved to Zurich. In 2002 her work started gaining recognition with the publication of several books on her life and a reunion just before Easter 2002 when 60 of the survivors she helped save reunited in Elne to honour La Señorita. She subsequently was

- awarded the status of Righteous among the Nations by the Government of Israel in 2002.
- made an honorary citizen of Elne
- awarded the Orden Civil de la Solidaridad Social by the Spanish Government in 2006
- awarded the Creu de Sant Jordi by the Generalitat of Catalonia in 2006
- awarded the star of the Légion d'honneur by the French Government in 2007
