= Healthcare in Nicaragua =

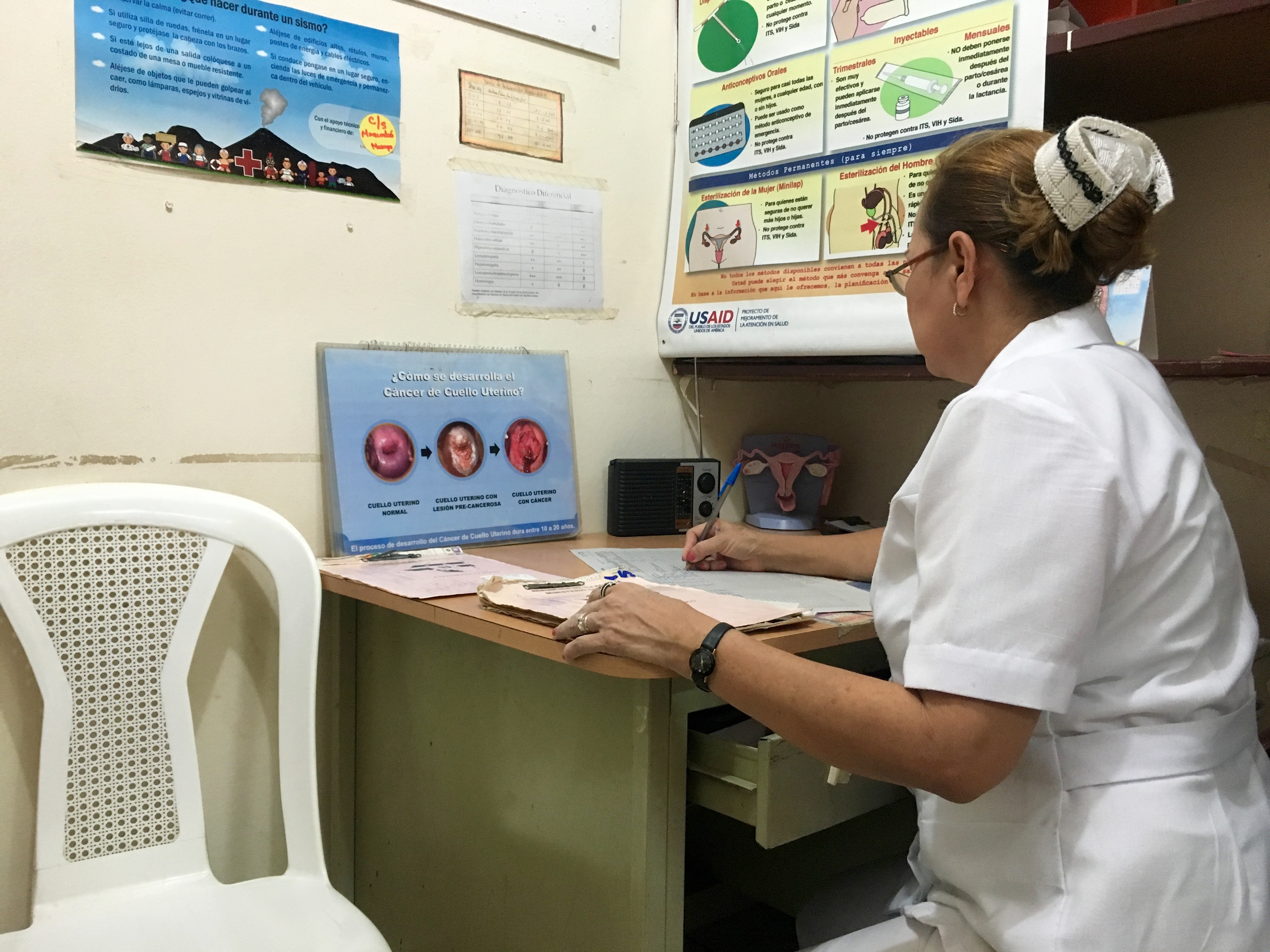
Nicaraguan nurse preparing to administer a Papanicolaou test

Healthcare in Nicaragua involves the collaboration of private and public institutions. Although Nicaragua's health outcomes have improved over the past few decades with the efficient utilization of resources relative to other Central American nations, it still confronts challenges responding to its population's diverse healthcare needs.

The Nicaraguan government guarantees universal free health care for its citizens. However, limitations of current delivery models and unequal distribution of resources and medical personnel contribute to the persistent lack of quality care in more remote areas of Nicaragua, especially among rural communities in the Central and Atlantic region. To respond to the dynamic needs of localities, the government has adopted a decentralized model that emphasizes community-based preventative and primary medical care.

== Healthcare system ==
=== History ===
==== Before the 1979 Sandinista Revolution ====
Before the 1979 Sandinista Revolution, the Nicaraguan health system consisted of four distinct agencies and independent health ministry offices in each province. There was little coordination amongst these institutions, and this system was fraught with provincial differences in salaries, administrative procedures, and more. During this 1970s period, Nicaragua had one of the worst life expectancies at birth and one of the highest levels of infant mortality in the regional area. Both of these measures have improved markedly up to 2016, average life expectancy now reaching 74.5 years.

There also existed an unequal distribution of health resources. Only 25 percent of the total health budget was controlled by the Ministry of Health, and 90 percent of the services went to ten percent of the population. Even though only a quarter of the population lived in the capital city of Managua, health professionals were disproportionately concentrated there. In 1972, half of all Nicaraguan doctors and more than two-thirds of nurses worked in Managua.

==== Post-revolution ====
After the 1979 Revolution, the new government established a new Unified National Health System that instated the Nicaraguan Ministry of Health (MINSA) at the head of health services throughout the nation. This system also integrated the Nicaraguan Social Security Institute (INSS) under MINSA's direction in order to make it financially feasible to provide a single national health service available to all Nicaraguan citizens, regardless of socioeconomic background. With the combination of these institutions, the INSS hospitals and clinics, previously only accessible to insured employees, then opened their doors to the larger population.

In 1984, in order to improve existing institutional infrastructure, ten percent of the national budget was allocated to the health sector. From 1979 to 1984, the government also successfully pushed for the construction of 309 new primary healthcare facilities and the training of over 3,000 health professionals. Following the wake of the Revolution, MINSA promoted several prevention-based health efforts, one of the earliest being its Brigadista program. This Brigadista program involved the training of community health advocates, the majority of whom were chosen from the Sandinista Youth Organization, who were selected to be trained and transported to serve in underserved rural regions.

Since the 1990s the Nicaraguan government has been changing towards more market-oriented economic policies that have affected the health sector. This healthcare shift has involved increased private sector activity as well as the decentralization of public services. Access to privately-operated healthcare services in Nicaragua may pose challenges for rural communities, influenced by factors including high costs, chronic under staffing, limited diagnostic and pharmaceutical resources, and the remote locations often requiring extended travel to reach such facilities.

Non-governmental organizations (NGO) have become more active in impoverished communities like Nicaragua. A particularly prevalent example of NGO work is medical volunteerism which encompasses free healthcare services, typically provided by international groups. NGO involvement became common around the year 2000, which is the year that the World Health Organization’s Alma Ata Declaration had identified for achieving the goal of health for all. With support from humanitarian agencies and development organizations, NGOs work to meet health care needs that are not met by the country's public health institutions. There is ongoing discussion about the benefits and drawbacks of such medical volunteerism.

=== Levels ===
The current Nicaraguan public health system follows a decentralized model. This model consists of three distinct administrative levels, each associated with different health services. Levels include (1) the central level, (2) the SILAIS (Local Systems of Comprehensive Care) level, and (3) the municipal level. The Nicaragua Ministry of Health (MINSA) directs the central level and is committed to ensuring universal access to free health services.

This decentralized model involves annual contracts between MINSA and local hospitals and health centers that are negotiated to set upcoming specific actions, goals, and funding allocation. The contract system is incentive based, and the amount of federal funding decided upon involves the consideration of institutional performance. As part of the public sector, the revenue generated from hospitals, healthcare centers, and SILAIS are consolidated and calculated by the Ministry of Finance before redistribution of certain percentages to the original institutions.

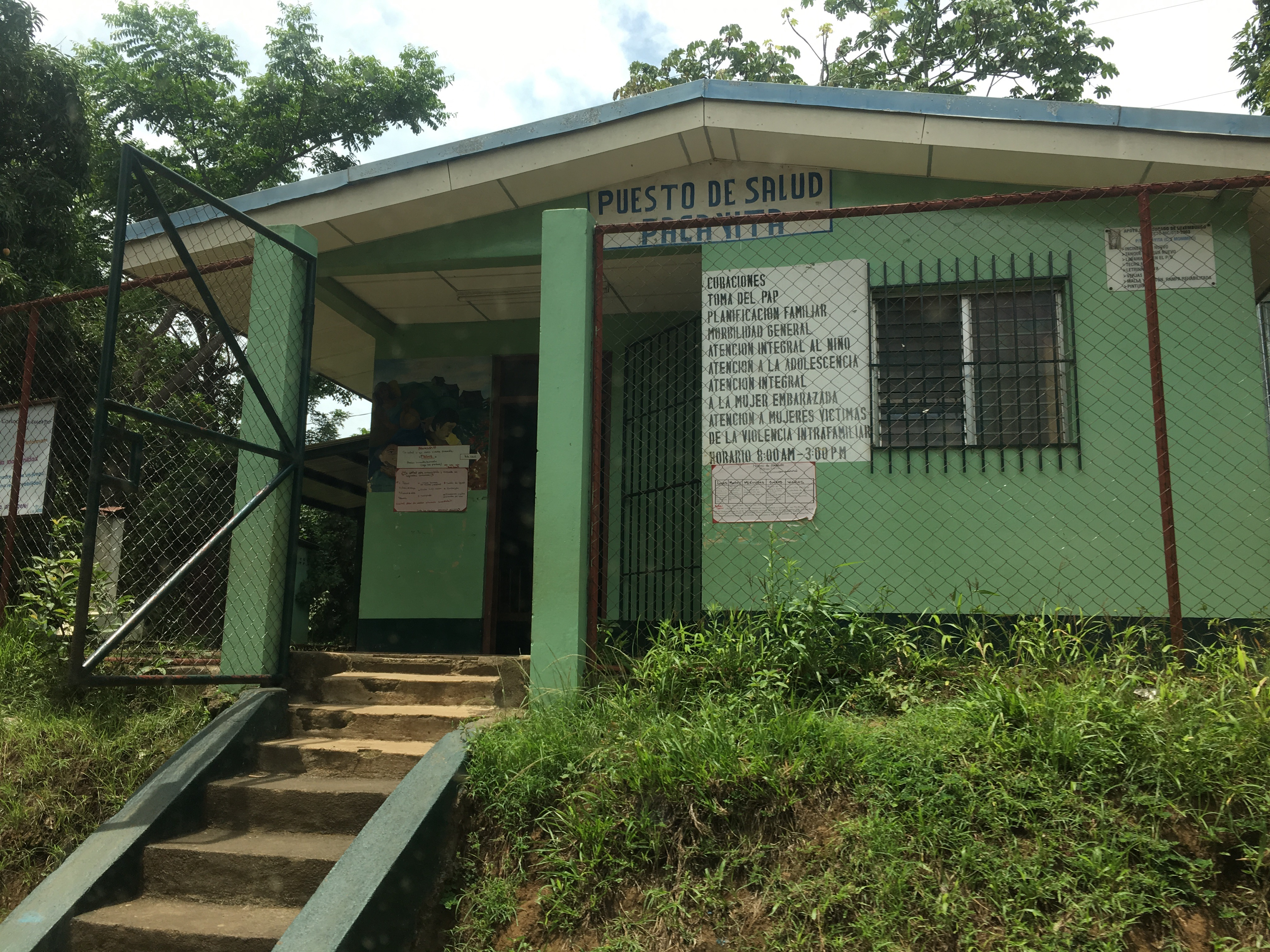
Pacayita health post in Catarina, Masaya, Nicaragua

==== Model of Family and Community Health (MOSAFC) ====
With the intention of maintaining decentralization while expanding citizens' access to quality healthcare, the Nicaraguan government implemented a structural framework model entitled the Conceptual Model of Family and Community Health (MOSAFC) in 2007. As determined by Nicaragua's General Law of Health (No. 423) the overall aim of MOSAFC is to establish integrated networks of public and private service providers that work together to harbor the responsibility of addressing the health needs of specific populations. The overarching goals of this framework were to offer more efficient delivery of health services, improve patient satisfaction with services, and advance the financial protection of citizen's health.

=== Healthcare workers ===
There is an unequal distribution of healthcare workers throughout Nicaragua's different provinces. Most healthcare workers are located on the Pacific coast region, while there is a huge need for primary health professionals in the cities of Jinotega and Matagalpa, as well as along the Caribbean coast. In the year 2000, while Managua contained 20% of the population, the city continued to harbor around half of the country's entire health care professionals.

This trend can be explained by overall low financial incentives for health care personnel, especially for work in remote areas. The average monthly salary for a general practitioner in Nicaragua under MINSA is US$544 while that of Honduras is US$1,332 and that of Panama is US$1,025. Additionally, although 52 percent of Nicaraguan doctors are specialized in training, this specialization level fails to meet widespread community needs for primary care. In order to improve the healthcare access of those living in more isolated areas, the public medical schools in Nicaragua require their graduates to perform two years of social service in high-need settings, after which they can opt to work in private institutions. This requirement aligns with MINSA's objective to encourage these graduates to work for the public health sector.

Amongst Nicaraguan doctors, there persists a lack of gender diversity. Nicaraguan women are underrepresented in the field of medicine, and within the healthcare field have an unemployment rate that is 3.5 times higher than that of men.

== Women and children's health ==
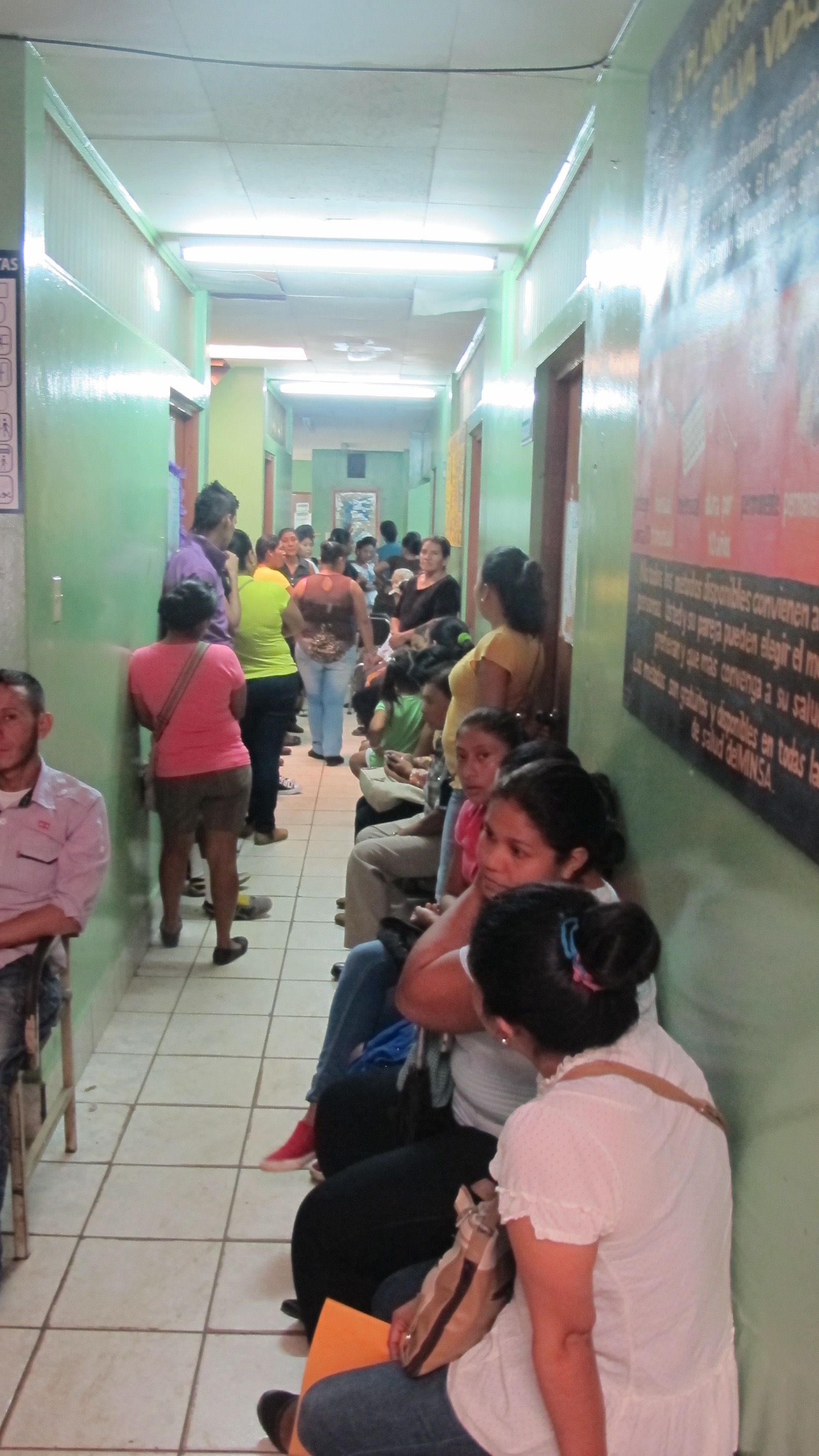
Women waiting outside a gynecological exam room in Masaya, Nicaragua

=== Reproductive health ===
Nicaragua's adolescent fertility rate is one of the highest in Latin America. Around half of women in Nicaragua give birth before the age of 20. Approximately one-quarter of all the births in the country involve adolescent mothers.

Lack of use of contraceptives contributes to this high pregnancy rate. Out of all sexually active female adolescents, only 7% utilize condoms and only 47% use any modern method of contraception. A highly tradition-based culture, a conservative government, and the influence of the Catholic Church have limited contraceptive use. Educational promotion of contraception is generally only conducted by nongovernmental agencies or women's groups, and it is popular belief among many that various forms of contraceptive methods are detrimental to one's health.

=== Cervical cancer ===
Nicaragua has one of the highest cervical cancer incidence rates in the world and the second highest morbidity rate in Latin America, second only to Haiti. Although screenings are provided through their national public health system, only 35% of women have had a Papanicolaou (PAP) smear test by the age of 35 years. A study showed that even when screenings services are adequate, patient follow-up and treatment after abnormal results is of poor quality. A low-cost early detection alternative to PAP smears used in Nicaragua involves visual inspection of cancerous cervical lesions with acetic acid.

== See also ==
- Abortion in Nicaragua
- History of Nicaragua
- List of hospitals in Nicaragua
- Project Nicaragua
