= Hospital volunteer =

Volunteers in hospitals who work without pay

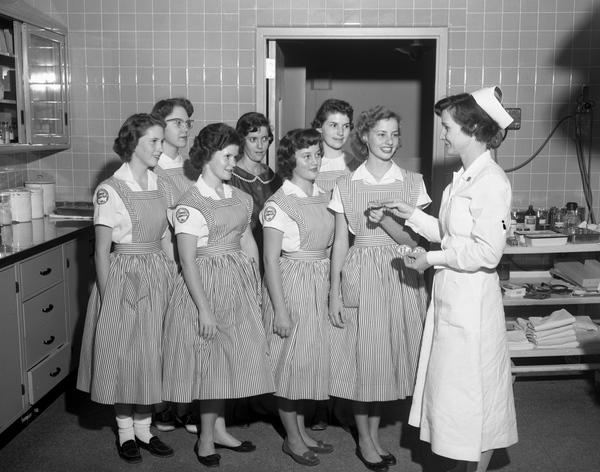
- Candy stripers in training in Tallahassee, Florida, 1957

Occupation
- Synonyms: Candy striper
- Occupation type: Volunteer
- Activity sectors: Health care

Description
- Related jobs: Nurse

Hospital volunteers, also known in the United States as candy stripers, are workers who do not receive regular pay in a variety of health care settings. Often, they are directly supervised by nurses.

The term candy striper is derived from the red-and-white striped pinafores that female volunteers traditionally wore, which are culturally reminiscent of candy canes. The term and its associated uniform are less frequently used in current clinical settings.

Another hospital volunteer organization sponsored by the American Red Cross, was the "Blue Teens" who wore blue-and-white striped pinafores. The female adult volunteers of this organization were known as "Grey Ladies" and wore light grey uniforms.

In the United States, volunteers' services are of considerable importance to individual patients as well as the health care system in general. Some people volunteer during high school or college (and more rarely at the middle school level) out of curiosity about health-care professions, an interest in learning to be of service in a community volunteer organization, or in order to satisfy community service requirements as required by some schools. Additionally, other people choose to volunteer at later stages in their life, particularly after retirement.

== History ==
Candy Stripers originated as a high-school civics class project in East Orange, New Jersey, in 1944. The uniforms were sewn by the girls in the class from material provided by the teacher – a red-and-white-striped fabric known as "candy stripe". The students chose East Orange General Hospital as the home for their class project.

Red Cross pins and patches were also worn on the uniforms indicating completion of required Red Cross training.

Usually a hospital sponsored either Candy Striper or Blue Teen volunteers but not both.

== Duties ==
Hospital volunteers assist in various tasks depending on the needs of the facility. Common duties include greeting visitors, delivering mail, transporting items such as lab specimens or medical records, and helping with light cleaning. In some settings, they may assist with activities like art or music therapy, sterilize laboratory equipment, or provide comfort to newborns.

Some hospitals assign volunteers to housekeeping roles, such as changing bed linens. More involved positions—such as volunteer orderlies or patient-care liaisons—may include limited patient interaction under medical supervision, and are more typical in large or teaching hospitals.

Volunteers may be placed in specific departments or assigned based on current needs. Their attire usually includes a standard shirt and slacks, along with a visible identification badge. To prevent confusion with medical personnel, scrubs are generally not worn.

== See also ==
- Medical volunteerism
