= VFI =

VFI may stand for:

- Vintners' Federation of Ireland, an association of publicans
- Volunteer Functions Inventory, a research framework for studying volunteer motivations
- Volunteers for Israel, an American non-profit organization that volunteers to do civilian work on Israeli Defense Force bases
- Voltage and Frequency Independent, a class of uninterruptible power supply
