= Project Nicaragua =

US-based nonprofit organization

Project Nicaragua Proyecto Nicaragua
- Project Nicaragua Logo
- Formation: 2004
- Type: Nonprofit Organization
- Purpose: Outreach
- Headquarters: Los Angeles, California, U.S.
- Region served: Nicaragua, United States
- Website: www.projectnic.org (in English)

Project Nicaragua (also known as Proyecto Nicaragua in Spanish) is a 501(3)(c) non-profit, apolitical organization in both the United States and Nicaragua. Its purpose is to improve the quality of health care in Nicaragua, the second-poorest country in the Western Hemisphere, since 2004, when the founding members of the organization traveled to El Antonio Lenin Fonseca Hospital in Managua, Nicaragua, to donate medical supplies.

== History and organization ==
=== University of California, Los Angeles ===
In December 2004, medical students Ravi Menghani, Grant Lee, Willie Siu, and undergraduate Daniel Choi travelled to Nicaragua, under the guidance of UCLA Pediatric Neurosurgeon Dr. Jorge Lazareff to investigate the high incidence of spina bifida in the region and barriers to healthcare. The initial team visited El Hospital Antonio Lenin Fonseca and observed a significant lack of medical tools, technology, and supplies. They found a need for intervention and presented their work at the 55th annual AMSA Convention in Washington, D.C. Since then Project Nicaragua was founded and has been making yearly visits to Lenin Fonseca, and more recently to La Mascota (children's hospital), to supply the hospitals with important equipment, such as neurosurgical drills, medical textbooks, computers, gauze, gloves, and more. The chapter also established a Scholarship Program at the UNAN, which will fund medical school for three chosen candidates. The scholarship program is designed to resolve boundaries to quality healthcare through a strategic process called capacity building—a process that will empower locals and build a self sustainable social infrastructure that will take a knowledge based approach to effectively eradicate various barriers to healthcare. The team also donated medical supplies, which were provided by Stryker Corporation and UCLA Renew, to the Antonio Lenin Fonseca Hospital in Managua, Nicaragua, where they launched an epidemiology research project, which allowed them to survey 115 patients in the Emergency Room. The team maintained their productivity by continuing their research on Spina Bifida and organizing a health fair at Nandaime, Nicaragua.

=== University of California, San Diego ===
AMOS Health and Hope is an organization based in Nicaragua that seek to directly work with impoverished communities in the country.

The UCSD chapter of Project Nicaragua was founded about a year after the UCLA chapter when Assistant Executive Director Stanley Park in January 2006. Under his direction, a team of three students traveled to Managua, Nicaragua in September 2006 to help create a relationship with La Mascota Pediatric Hospital, conduct research on spina bifida, and donate medical supplies that had been provided by our Chairman of the Board and Executive Advisor, Dr. Jorge Lazareff, to El Lenin Fonseca Hospital. Since its founding, the chapter has established connections with the International Neurosurgical Children’s Association and AMOS Health and Hope. Project Nicaragua’s connection with AMOS Health and Hope has been used to conduct research about the prevalent rate of parasites in school aged children in San Jose de Los Remates, Boaco, Nicaragua and build clinics in El Bejuco. In addition to receiving ten thousand dollars from the Strauss Foundation, the UCSD chapter has been the 2008–2009 recipients of the Chapin Cole and Melissa Higgins Lifelong Service Award, 2009–2010 Alumni Engagement Award, and 2011–2012 UCSD Grants for Change.

=== Ohio State University ===
Project Nicaragua at Ohio State University was established in 2009 and is currently advised by Dr. Thomas Mauger, Chairman of OSU's Department of Ophthalmology, and Dr. Rebecca Kuennen of the Ohio State University Havener Eye Institute. Project Nicaragua at OSU is involved in the medical aspects of Nicaraguan healthcare and addresses social and economic factors that can affect health. They work with community partners to address root causes of health disparity in Nicaragua. The OSU team’s work started with the CENAO Collaboration. CENAO is Nicaragua’s National Eye Hospital, the only public and teaching ophthalmology hospital in the country; Project Nicaragua at OSU collected medical equipment and supplies for the hospital. Their main project is the Rancho Grande Initiative which includes a collaboration with Amor en Acción, a non-profit organization based in Nicaragua, to assist in development work in the mountainous municipality of Rancho Grande. The OSU team works on several community-based initiatives in the region to improve educational opportunities, establish means for sustainable economic empowerment, and increase access to healthcare and nutrition through research on nutrition security. Since 2015, the chapter has sent a team to Nicaragua twice a year. They have also been accepted for several Clinton Global Initiative conferences, which allows them to learn more about how they can make an impact in Nicaragua.

From September 2010 to December 2010, they have aided in raising funds for Escuela Tierra Prometidas, an agricultural and technical school, the building of which was completed in the spring of 2011. Additionally, the Ohio State chapter was able to donate laptops for the purpose of teaching students English and programs like Microsoft PowerPoint and Excel. This project was made possible by NewPage Corporation, who donated the laptops to Project Nicaragua. Along with the new education opportunities, a sewing and craft center was established as an economic opportunity for women and teenagers of the community; at the center, they can learn to sew various items, which are then sold in the town. The Ohio State chapter is also looking for vendors in the U.S. Lastly, the chapter also funded the opening of the Mana del Cielo bakery, or Food from Heaven bakery, another economic opportunity for the young adults of the community. This bakery offers students and community members an opportunity to learn about running a business. The group also ran the cookstove project, installing safe cooking stoves in 30 homes and adding 10 each winter since 2015.

Stateside, the Ohio State chapter has spent most of its efforts fundraising. They have volunteered at Nationwide arena, working events in the concessions stands, and receiving donations for their time. They have held euchre tournaments in addition to other fundraisers and collection drives. Their most successful collection drive occurred in the spring of 2011 when over 500 pairs of eyeglasses were collected and taken to CENAO. In the near future, the Ohio State chapter will be focusing its efforts on assessing the success of these projects as well as starting new projects to increase health awareness and address environment concerns.

=== University of California, Berkeley ===
The University of California, Berkeley chapter, the fourth Project Nicaragua chapter, was founded by Devin Erbay under the leadership of Executive Board members, Daniela Somarriba, Samuel Choi, and Iman Zahedi in 2012.

=== Vanderbilt University ===
The Vanderbilt chapter of Project Nicaragua was founded in the fall of 2012 by Vanderbilt student Rebecca Wang during her sophomore year. Working closely with two faculty advisers, Drs. Neerav Desai and Lindy Fenlason, the Vanderbilt chapter collaborated with CENAO, the National Eye Hospital, and La Mascota Children's Hospital in Managua, Nicaragua. For their inaugural trip in May 2013, the Vanderbilt chapter donated over 1,000 pairs of used eyeglasses collected over the year to CENAO along with hundreds of dental and medical supplies to La Mascota. The Vanderbilt chapter also worked with the non-profit organization, FNE, based in Chacraseca, a small rural community outside of Leon, Nicaragua. They raised money to build a house for a family in need and also taught lessons on nutrition, exercise, dental hygiene, and sex education. Ever since the first trip in May 2013, the Vanderbilt chapter has continued to expand and work closely with the National Eye Hospital and FNE in Leon. In December 2014, the Vanderbilt chapter implemented an art therapy project for special needs students in Chichigalpa with FNE. In the spring of 2015, the Vanderbilt chapter started Skype tutoring lessons with students taking English classes in Chacraseca. The Vanderbilt chapter hopes to expand their efforts in both Managua and Leon through their annual trips to Nicaragua as well through fundraising, collecting supplies, and tutoring throughout the year.

=== Founders ===
Project Nicaragua was founded primarily at the University of California, Los Angeles (UCLA) after the initial trip in December 2004 by the following individuals: Dr. Jorge Lazareff, Dr. Ravi Menghani, Dr. Grant Lee, Dr. Daniel Choi, Dr. Willie Siu, and Dr. Stanley Park.

=== Board of Advisers ===
The current Board of Advisers include Chairmen and Executive Adviser Dr. Jorge Lazareff, Doctor George Chiang, and Doctor Thomas Mauger and Doctor Rebecca Kuennen.

=== Board of directors ===
The current Board of Directors include:

- Executive Director – Dr. Ravi Menghani, MD, MBA
- Assistant Executive Director – Stanley Park, MD
- National Finance Director – Samuel Choi
- National Finance Director – John Scheick

== Medical and scientific outreach ==
=== El Antonio Lenin Fonseca Hospital ===
El Antonio Lenin Fonseca Hospital is a public teaching hospital located in Managua, Nicaragua. Physicians at Lenin Fonseca provide external consultation to about 800 patients, emergency consultation to about 300 patients, and perform anywhere from 40 to 50 surgeries on a daily basis.

=== La Mascota Hospital ===
La Mascota Hospital is a public hospital located in Managua, Nicaragua. It provides patients with the following specialities:Urology, Nutrition, Oncology, Psychology, Radiology, Neurology, Cardiology, and Neurology.

=== Spina Bifida ===
In June 2009, under the guidance of Senior Directors, Iman Zahedi and Samuel Choi, the UCLA chapter established important relationships with the Nicaraguan Ministry of Health, PATH, ASNIC, and UNAN Managua. Along with the preliminary data from the first mission, research into the causes of spina bifida and the native diet led our team to believe that fortification of rice with folic acid is the most feasible path for decreasing the incidence of neural tube defects in Nicaragua. After several meetings between Project Nicaragua at UCLA and Nicaragua’s Ministry of Health, the Nicaraguan government signed a bill mandating nationwide fortification of rice—a step towards better health in which the UCLA chapter of Project Nicaragua have been deemed the catalysts.

== See also ==
- Healthcare in Nicaragua
