= Medical volunteerism =

Medical volunteering

Medical volunteerism, also medical volunteering, is volunteering in the context of providing medical treatment. It is one form of both international and domestic volunteering. International medical volunteering may include a range of resource-based solutions associated with the set up of a mobile clinic, volunteer assistance in local hospitals or clinics, or at home healthcare services.

== Motivations of volunteers ==
Motivations of medical volunteers, analyzed through the Volunteer Functions Inventory framework, have been found to be focused on the values dimension first, followed by understanding, enhancement, social, career, and protective ones. Out of these, the first two were most important. In other words, the most common reason for medical volunteering is expressing or acting on important values, such as humanitarianism and helping those less fortunate and seeking to learn more about the world and/or exercise skills that are often unused.

Beyond personal motivations, the emergence of medical volunteerism often stems as a response to the politics of needs interpretation within a society, the contestation in determining which welfare needs deserve legitimation and which institutions assume responsibility for its fulfillment. Volunteers and their contributions could be interpreted as a mode of discursive engagement when the state fails to adequately serve marginalized needs. This motivation reframes volunteerism past charitable efforts and as active participants in the evolving social contract and obligations between state institutions and citizens.

== Ethics ==
Medical volunteering has in general been praised as “ethical imperative to serve the disadvantaged”. Medical volunteers may have good intentions and aid beneficiaries may be grateful for their help. Yet, scholars have explored the significant drawbacks of such volunteerism.

Short term medical volunteerism abroad, often in developing countries, is sometimes criticized as medical voluntourism. While millions of individuals depend on the free assistance offered through medical volunteer work, such activities are criticized when compared to the alternative notion of sustainable capacities, i.e., work done in the context of long-term, locally-run, and foreign-supported infrastructures. A preponderance of this criticism appears largely in scientific and peer-reviewed literature. Recently, media outlets with more general readerships have published such criticisms as well.

Local communities often voice concerns regarding the transient nature of international medical groups, whose presence is often perceived as convenient but fleeting. These missions typically last between one week to two months, limiting their impact as they can only attend to a fraction of patients within a short timeframe. When volunteer organizations function through temporary deployments, they often lack the organizational infrastructure needed to recognize and navigate deep-rooted structural issues that prevent healthcare access for rural families in need. Short-term interventions risk serving as "medical ban-aids" that provide relief, leaving the realm of inequalities untouched. This brief interaction impedes the establishment of meaningful patient-provider relationships, which are crucial for effective treatment. Moreover, inadequate communication prior to the arrival of these groups causes stress for patients who struggle to plan accordingly. Services being provided during the day may necessitate time off work, which is difficult to arrange at short notice.

Local healthcare teams also encounter challenges due to limited notice, hindering their ability to relay information to patients and adequately prepare to assist foreign teams as required. Additionally, ethical concerns arise from the lack of experience and training among volunteers. Despite their well intentioned efforts, many volunteers lack certification, potentially endangering already vulnerable patients. There is also the risk that volunteers may exploit the desperate need for assistance in under-served countries as an opportunity to gain hands-on experience. Considering long-term consequences, the provision of free services by international groups may foster dependency on foreign aid and alleviate pressure on local authorities to address systemic gaps in healthcare access.

Progression towards more ethical and sustainable change necessitates volunteers to prioritize the creation of long-term relationships with local healthcare facilities and providers. Sustainable development in this field can only be achieved once medical outreach is reframed not as isolated interventions but as an ongoing process that strengthens the capacity of local institutional care. Through integrating their mission goals with preexisting local community systems, volunteer collectives can collaborate with local governance to provide care in areas where current state provisioning fails. This collaborative model would ensure the impact of volunteer labor to reach structural inequalities that persist and outlast deployment timeframes, offering systemic aid to unmet health rights within marginalized populations.

Furthermore, ethical practice requires a fundamental change in how volunteer parties perceive host communities. Instead of focusing on population deficits, which center the narrative around scarcity and absence, sustainable care adopts the concept of "cultural community wealth". This concept recognizes and highlights the indigenous expertise and knowledge embedded within local communities, understood as various forms of capital including social, aspirational, navigational, and linguistic, among others.

By understanding both the shortcomings and strengths of their medical missions, volunteer collectives can incorporate these internal strengths into their service model to ensure that even after they leave, local clinics and communities will maintain a strong foundation to continuing address their health disparities. These changes serve to shift medical volunteerism from fleeting aid to lasting contributions to local cultures of health, addressing the gaps between national healthcare objectives and rural care realities.

== Types of volunteer work ==
While often seen in the context of volunteer physicians and nurses, the term can also cover the case of volunteers for clinical trials that are motivated by non-financial gains.

=== Dental volunteering ===
Volunteering in the context of providing dental care is dental volunteering. Volunteering in international healthcare facilities is gaining popularity. Volunteer efforts in dentistry are widespread in the underdeveloped world. The World Dental Federation (Federation Dentaire Internationale, FDI) has defined the term Dental Volunteer as "A qualified and registered/licensed dentist who provides time and work free of charge". Typical dental volunteering workforce includes, Dentist/ Dental Surgeons, Dental Specialists, Dental Hygienists, Dental and Hygienist students. The factors that encourage the desire to involve in voluntary care include a desire to give back to the community, a desire to be more understanding of patients' needs, and a desire to feel fulfilled in their work. Volunteers' have expressed reasons for giving their time and energy range from altruism and the desire to 'help others' to spiritual and career advancement. It is clear that not all dental professionals feel the same way about giving back to the community.

Dental volunteering has a potential of making a substantial contribution for the global oral health. Significant opportunity for fresh experiences are afforded to individuals in volunteer work. They enable participants to respect various cultures and ways of life while making a constructive contribution to the target community, whether that group is domestic or international. Dental volunteers play a crucial role in providing dental treatment to patients at community health centers. Considering that paid medical staff availability and willingness to serve cannot be assured, sustained reliance on volunteers presents significant difficulties. Some states of the United States have implemented a mechanism for volunteering in exchange for continuing education credits. It has been help underprivileged communities, however the reports have indicated that it has not fixed the problem of limited access to care. Earning continuing education credits for volunteering is generally viewed as a positive development.

However, the typical approach in dental volunteering in developing countries are often criticized. Volunteer non-profit organizations (NGO) in the dental field have made significant strides toward eliminating worldwide disparities in oral health. However, the dental NGO sector is much less well understood than the medical and health NGO sector. The FDI, published a seminal study in 2002 analyzing baseline data about dental aid organizations. Most of the dental NGOs are small in size, run on a shoestring budget, employ only a handful of people (most of whom are volunteers), lack professional management, provide inconsistent quality assurance, are unaware of relevant research, and have poor lines of communication and collaboration with one another. Concerns have been raised that certain volunteer programs may actually do more harm than good to the communities they aim to assist. It is reported that sometimes locals in host areas have a mixed reaction to volunteers. As a result of insufficient understanding, some projects have the potential to cause harm by being paternalistic, diminishing confidence in local health systems, failing to maintain patient safety, causing economic harm to local providers, and focusing more on volunteers than local communities. As a result, there is a call for further education of the concept among volunteer dental practitioners.

== History ==
=== International medical volunteerism ===
In the 1800s and early 1900s, during the period of European colonialism, international medical volunteering were considered "heroic missions" and a "Christian duty". Starting in the 1960s, secular medical volunteering abroad emerged as a response to the lack of qualified healthcare personnel in developing countries and to the advent of nongovernmental and governmental organizations. This led to doctors and nurses practicing Western bio-medicine in non-Western environments. Almost a decade later, the growing interest in international volunteering was aided by globalization, which has played a pivotal role in the increased sense of global connectivity and awareness of health disparities and humanitarian needs. Major global health initiatives presented a notable shift from disease-specific interventions (specifically malaria and HIV) to the advancement of general health care, and a focus on access to resources such as clean water, education, primary care, and hygiene. Starting in the 19th century, the WHO (World Health Organization) sought to encourage a change in policies to effectively bolster internal healthcare system. Following this, there was a rapid increase in the number of privately-managed short-term medical brigades, providing solutions aimed at outlining the WHO.

The historical evolution of medical volunteerism is fundamentally connected to changes within national healthcare systems often characterized by transitions from public provisioning to market-based models. In many developing countries, the late twentieth century represented a steady change from universalist healthcare policies, where state provisioning dominated in healthcare delivery, to "hybrid" models that introduced fee-for-service models and paved space for the growth of private healthcare providers.

== Historical examples ==
During the 1793 yellow fever epidemic in Philadelphia, many of the city's black citizens offered voluntary nursing and logistical services in an attempt to mitigate the spread of infection. This was done at the behest of Benjamin Rush, who, while operating under the incorrect assumption that black and mixed-race citizens were resistant to the disease, appealed to the black community for help during the crisis.

Assistance from the American Red Cross during the 1918 Influenza pandemic was vital in mitigating the spread of the disease. The decision to intervene in the first World War had diverted many domestic resources to the war effort, thus causing shortages of both medical supplies and personnel. The American Red Cross was called upon by then Surgeon General Rupert Blue to help alleviate these deficits. Though the services provided by local Red Cross chapters varied depending on the needs of the communities to which they were attached, the organization devoted significant effort and resources to combatting the outbreak.

== Contemporary examples ==
Medical volunteering is a major activity of a number of NGOs such as Médecins Sans Frontières. Activities of Wikipedia's WikiProject Medicine have also been discussed in the context of medical volunteering.

== See also ==
- Emergency Medical Service
- Hospital volunteering
- Volunteer fire department
- Volunteer tourism
