= Volunteering =

Act of freely giving time and labor

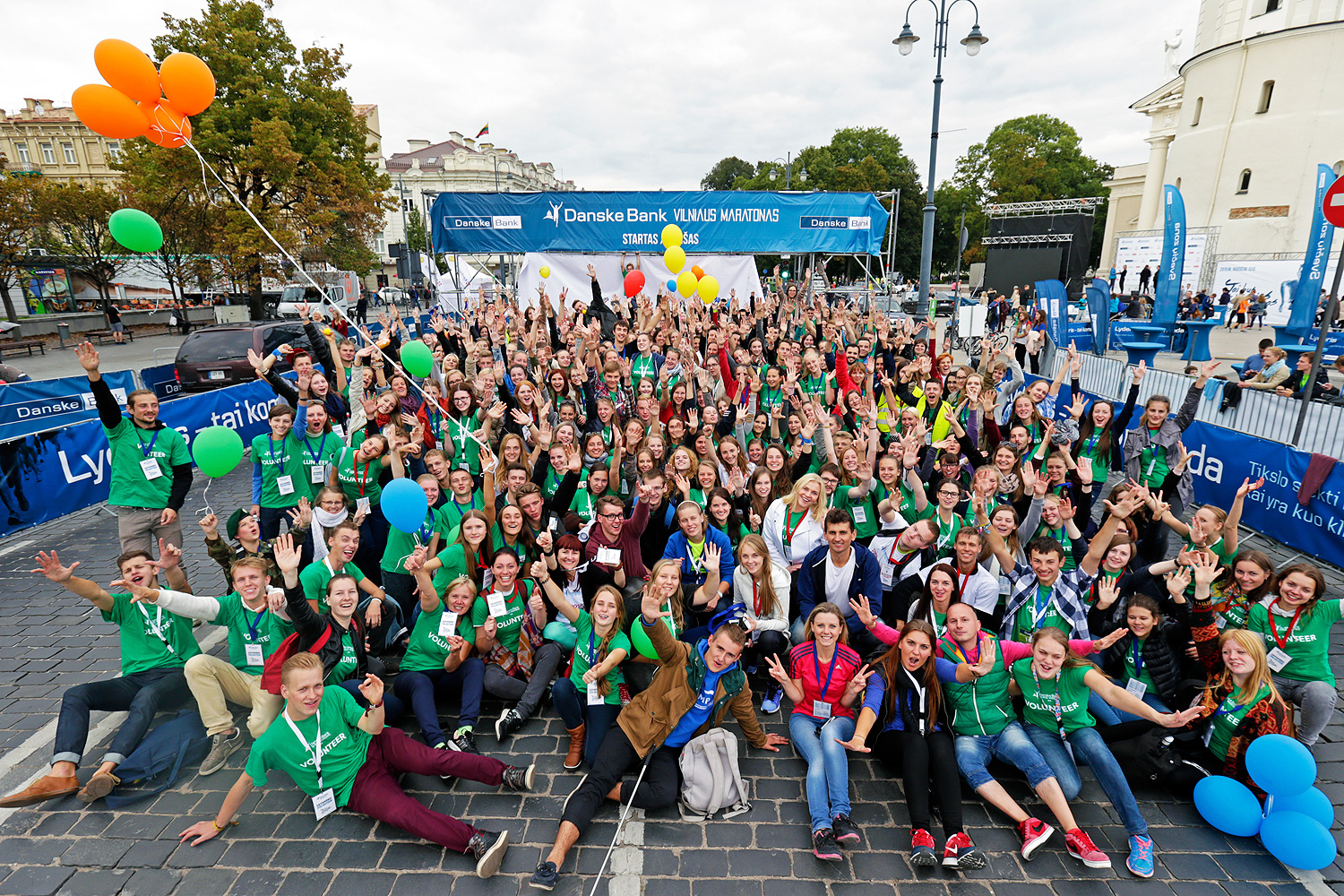
Volunteers at the Vilnius Marathon

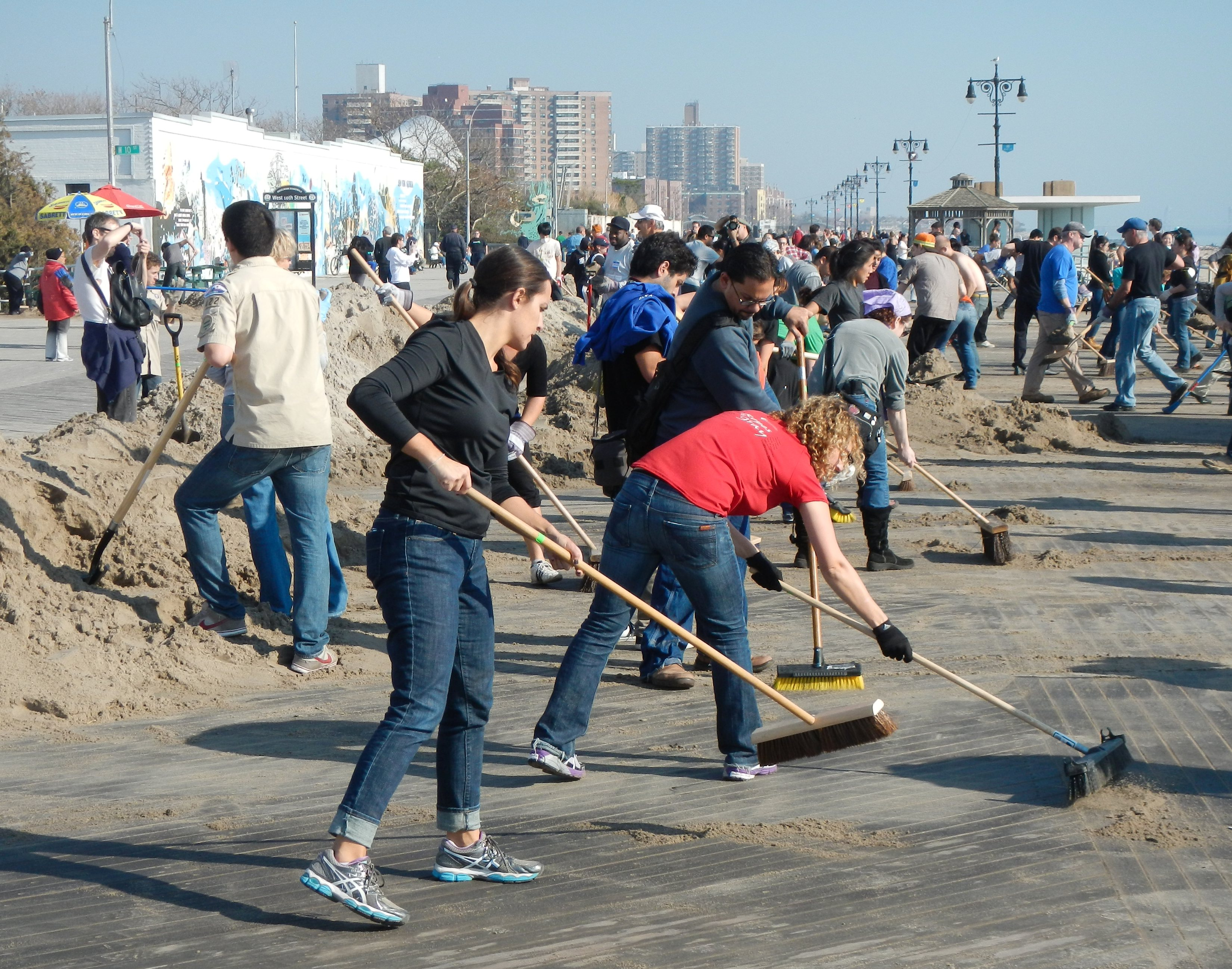
Volunteers sweep the boardwalk in Brooklyn after the 2012 Hurricane Sandy

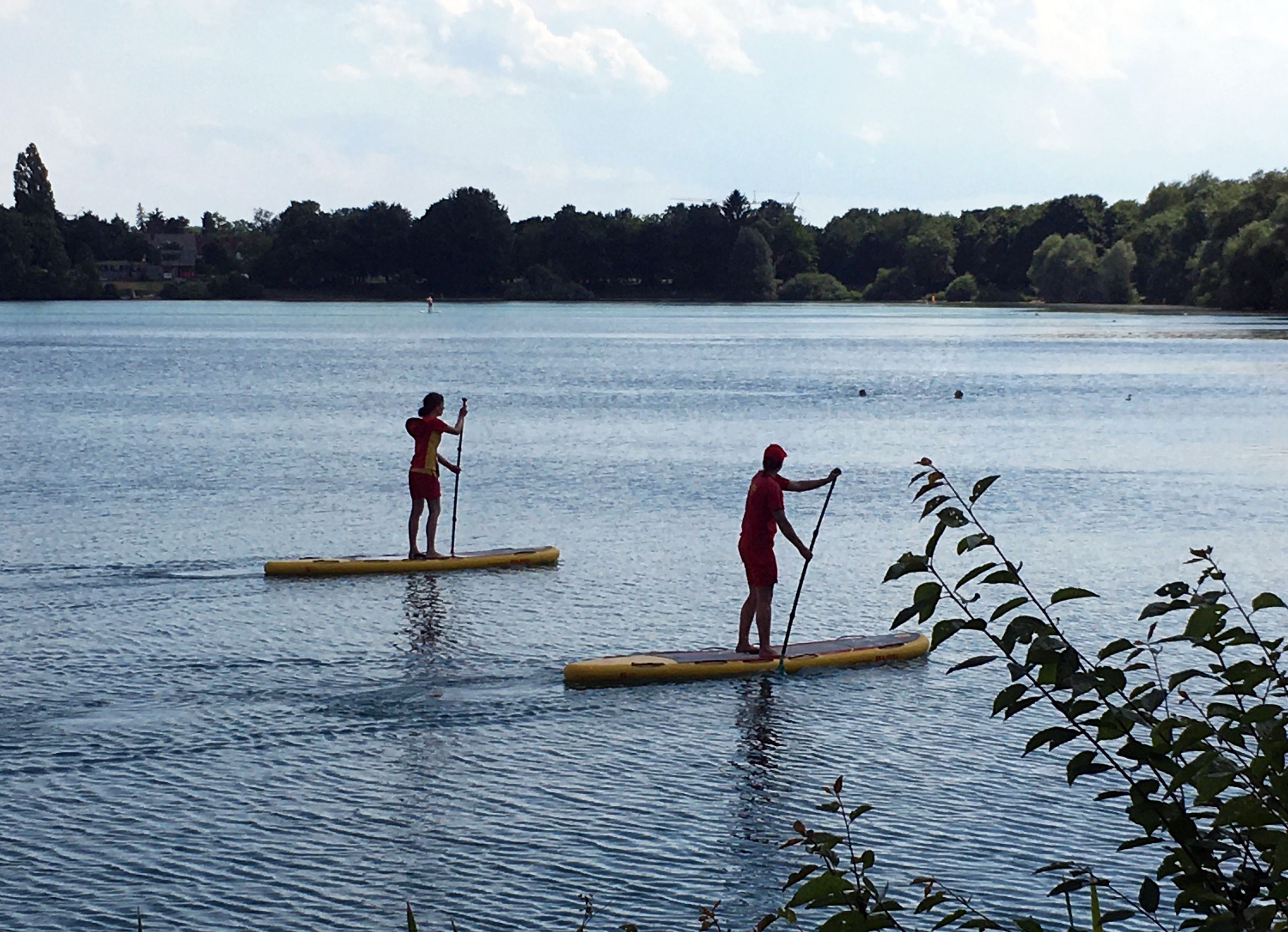
Semi-professional volunteering: Trained lifeguards of the German DLRG, the largest voluntary water rescue organization in the world, patrolling a public bathing area of a lake in Munich

Volunteering is an optional and freely chosen act of an individual or group giving their time and labor, often for community service. Many volunteers have specialized training in the fields that they work in, such as medicine, education, or emergency rescue. Others provide their services as needed, such as in response to a natural disaster.

== Etymology and history ==
The verb was first recorded in 1755. It was derived from the noun volunteer, in c. 1600, "one who offers himself for military service," from the Middle French voluntaire. In the non-military sense, the word was first recorded during the 1630s. The word volunteering has more recent usage—still predominantly military—coinciding with the phrase community service. In a military context, a volunteer army is a military body whose soldiers have chosen to enlist, as opposed to having been conscripted. Such volunteers do not work "for free" and are given regular pay.

=== 19th century ===
During this time, America experienced the Great Awakening. People became aware of the disadvantaged and realized the cause for movement against slavery. In 1851, the first YMCA in the United States was started, followed seven years later by the first YWCA. During the American Civil War, women volunteered their time to sew supplies for the soldiers, and the "Angel of the Battlefield" Clara Barton and a team of volunteers began providing aid to servicemen. Barton founded the American Red Cross in 1881 and began mobilizing volunteers for disaster relief operations, including relief for victims of the Johnstown Flood in 1889.

=== 20th and 21st centuries ===
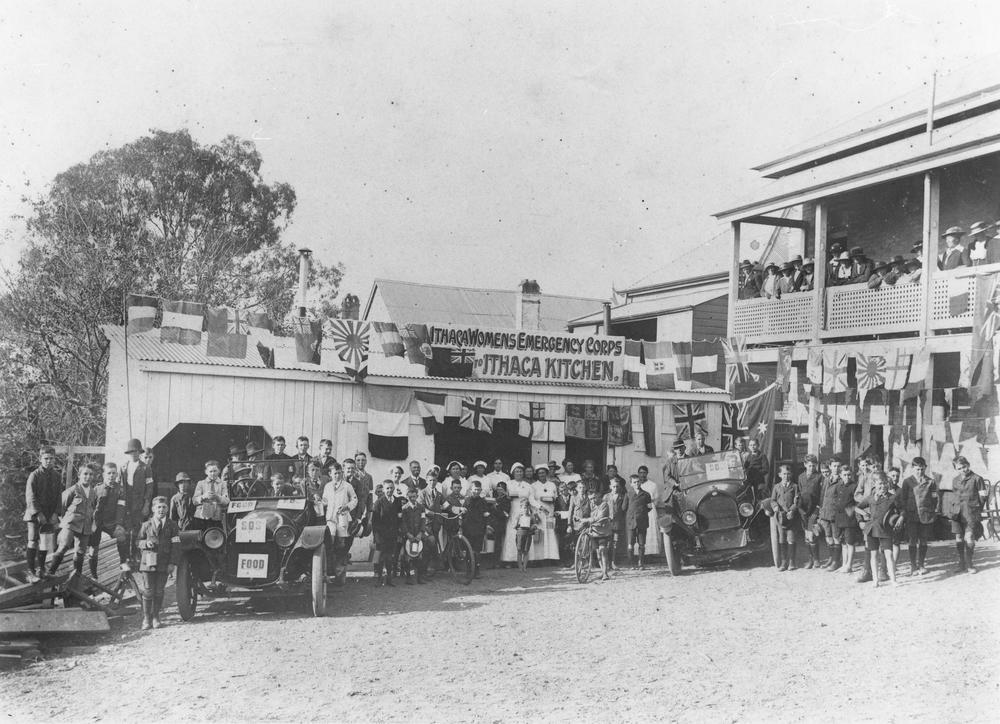
Volunteers from around the world came to Ithaca, Queensland to address an influenza epidemic through the Women's Emergency Corps (later the Women's Volunteer Reserve) in July 1919.

The Salvation Army is one of the oldest and largest organizations working for disadvantaged people. Though it is a charity organization, it has organized a number of volunteering programs since its inception. Prior to the 19th century, few formal charitable organizations existed to assist people in need.

In the first few decades of the 20th century, several volunteer organizations were founded, including the Rotary International, Kiwanis International, Association of Junior Leagues International, and Lions Clubs International.

The Great Depression saw one of the first large-scale efforts to coordinate volunteering for a specific need in the US. During World War II, thousands of volunteer offices supervised the volunteers who helped with the many needs of the military and the home front, including collecting supplies, entertaining soldiers on leave, and caring for the injured.

After World War II, people shifted the focus of their altruistic passions to other areas, including helping the poor and volunteering overseas. A major development was the Peace Corps in the United States in 1960. When President Lyndon B. Johnson declared a War on Poverty in 1964, volunteer opportunities started to expand and continued into the next few decades. The process for finding volunteer work became more formalized, with more volunteer centers forming and new ways to find work appearing on the World Wide Web through organizations like JustServe and AmeriCorps.

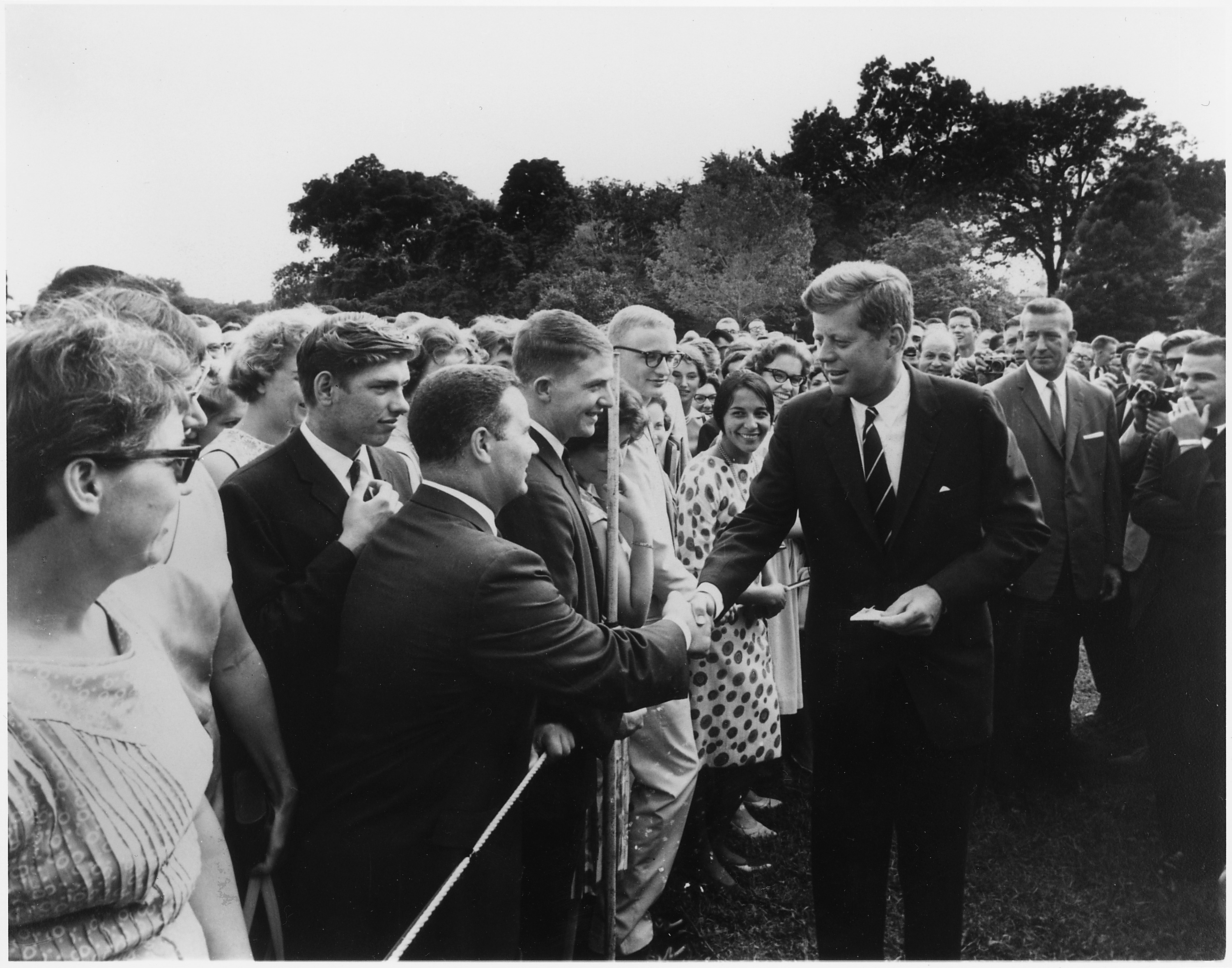
John F. Kennedy greets volunteers on 28 August 1961.

From September 2022 through September 2023, an estimated 75.8 million Americans aged 16 and older, or 28.3 percent of the civilian noninstitutional population in that age group, formally volunteered through an organization. They contributed about 4.99 billion hours, with an estimated economic value of $167.2 billion. During the same period, the survey estimated that 137.5 million Americans engaged in informal helping such as exchanging favors with neighbors, with a reported informal-helping rate of 54.3 percent.

== Types ==
=== Volunteering as utilized by service learning programs ===
Many schools on all education levels offer service-learning programs, which allow students to serve the community through volunteering while earning educational credit.

According to Alexander Astin in the foreword to Where's the Learning in Service-Learning? by Janet Eyler and Dwight E. Giles, Jr., "...we promote more wide-spread adoption of service-learning in higher education because we see it as a powerful means of preparing students to become more caring and responsible parents and citizens and of helping colleges and universities to make good on their pledge to 'serve society.'"

When describing service learning, the Medical Education at Harvard says, "Service learning unites academic study and volunteer community service in mutually reinforcing ways. ...service learning is characterized by a relationship of partnership: the student learns from the service agency and from the community and, in return, gives energy, intelligence, commitment, time and skills to address human and community needs." Volunteering in service learning seems to have the result of engaging both mind and heart, thus providing a more powerful learning experience; according to Janet Eyler and Dwight E. Giles, it succeeds by the fact that it "...fosters student development by capturing student interest..."

More recent scholarship has found shortcomings in the early assumptions of mutual benefit, since early studies were interested in educational benefits rather than community outcomes. An Indiana study found that the nonprofit agencies hosting student service-learners do not report a positive impact on service capacity, although service-learners do help to increase agency visibility.

=== Skills-based volunteering ===
Skills-based volunteering is leveraging the specialized skills and the talents of individuals to strengthen the infrastructure of nonprofits, helping them build and sustain their capacity to successfully achieve their missions. This is in contrast to traditional volunteering, where volunteers do something other than their professional work. The average hour of traditional volunteering is valued by the Independent Sector at between $18–20 an hour. Skills-based volunteering is, on average, valued at $220 an hour.

=== Virtual volunteering ===
Also called e-volunteering or online volunteering, virtual volunteering is a volunteer who completes tasks, in whole or in part, offsite from the organization being assisted. They use the Internet and a home, school, telecenter or work computer, or other Internet-connected device, such as a PDA or smartphone. Virtual volunteering is also known as cyber service, telementoring, and teletutoring, as well as various other names. Virtual volunteering is similar to remote work, except that instead of online employees who are paid, these are online volunteers who are not paid. Contributing to free and open source software projects or editing Wikipedia are examples of virtual volunteering.

=== Micro-volunteering ===
Micro-volunteering is a task performed via an internet-connected device. An individual typically does this task in small, un-paid increments of time. Micro-volunteering is distinct from "virtual volunteering" in that it typically does not require the individual volunteer to go through an application process, screening process, or training period.

=== Environmental volunteering ===
Environmental volunteering refers to the volunteers who contribute towards environmental management or conservation. Volunteers conduct a range of activities including environmental monitoring, ecological restoration such as re-vegetation and weed removal, protecting endangered animals, and educating others about the natural environment.Community-led initiatives such as Buz Stop Boys have contributed to improving urban sanitation in Accra.

=== Volunteering in an emergency ===
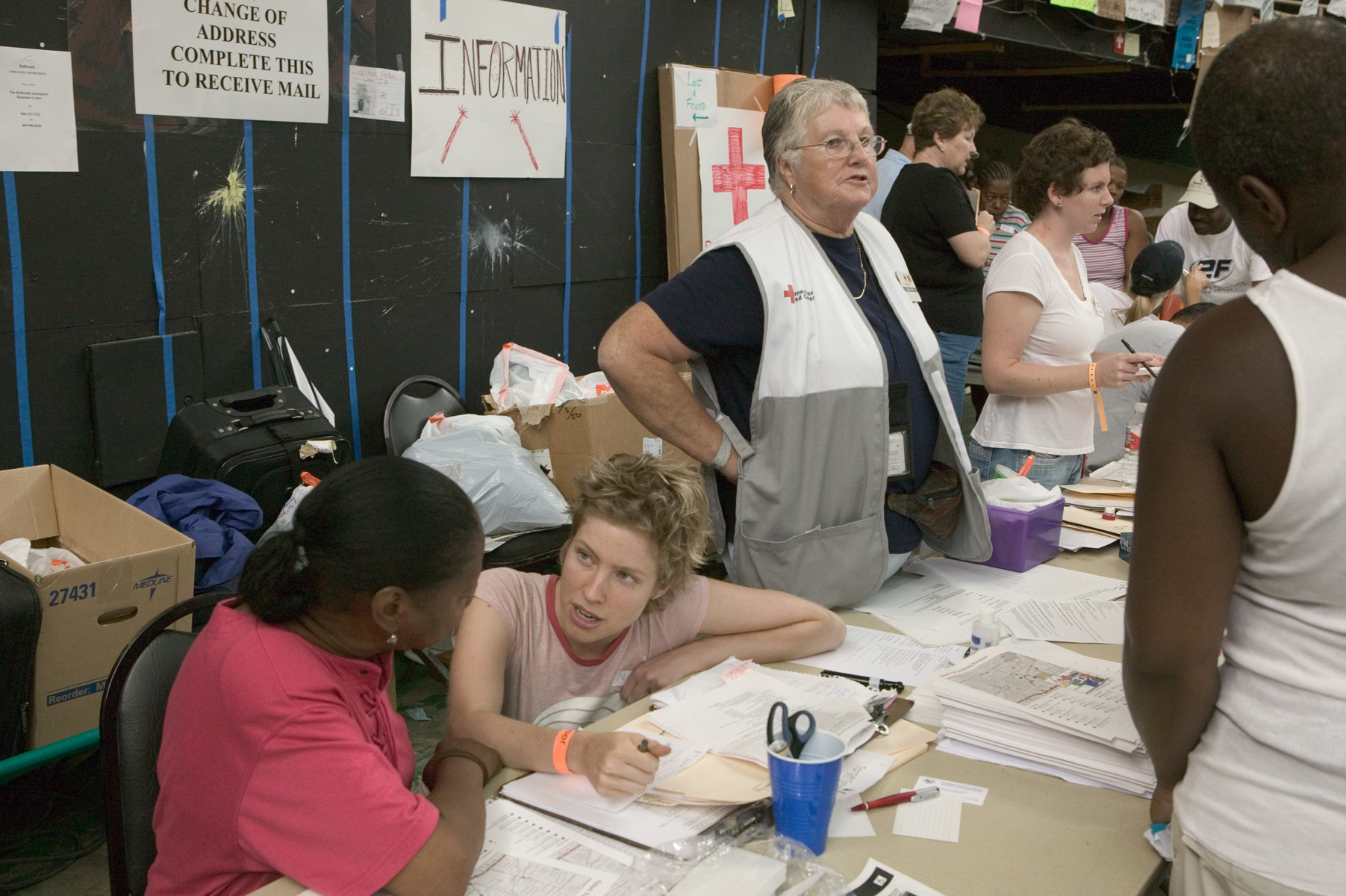
Volunteers assist survivors at the Houston Astrodome following Hurricane Katrina in September 2005.

Volunteering often plays a pivotal role in the recovery effort following natural disasters, such as tsunamis, floods, droughts, hurricanes, and earthquakes. For example, the 1995 Great Hanshin-Awaji earthquake in Japan was a watershed moment, bringing in many first-time volunteers for earthquake response. The 2004 Indian Ocean earthquake and tsunami attracted a large number of volunteers worldwide, deployed by non-governmental organizations, government agencies, and the United Nations.

During the 2012 hurricane Sandy emergency, Occupy Sandy volunteers formed a laterally organized rapid-response team that provided much needed help during and after the storm, from food to shelter to reconstruction. It is an example of mutualism at work, pooling resources and assistance and leveraging social media.

Volunteering is particularly consequential in the context of Disasters, which are those emergency situations associated with destruction and/or functional disruptions that may test or exceed the capacity of a community or society to respond.

In a time when disasters are increasing in frequency and intensity faster than the capacity of the community/society to respond can be developed, the relative importance of volunteer response will tend to grow.

=== Volunteering in schools ===
Resource poor schools around the world rely on government support or on efforts from volunteers and private donations, in order to run effectively. In some countries, whenever the economy is down, the need for volunteers and resources increases greatly. School systems offer many volunteer opportunities with minimal requirements. Whether one is a high school or TEFL (Teaching English as a Foreign Language) graduate or college student, most schools require just voluntary and selfless effort.

Much like the benefits of any type of volunteering there are great rewards for the volunteer, student, and school. In addition to intangible rewards, volunteers can add relevant experience to their resumes. Volunteers who travel to assist may learn foreign culture and language. "Volunteering can give the students the sufficient experience in order to support and strengthen their CVs and resumes."

Volunteering in schools can be an additional teaching guide for the students and help to fill the gap of local teachers. Cultural and language exchange during teaching and other school activities can be the most essential learning experience for both students and volunteers.

=== Corporate volunteering ===
Benefacto, a volunteering brokerage, describe corporate volunteering as "Companies giving their employees an allowance of paid time off annually, which they use to volunteer at a charity of their choice."

A majority of the companies at the Fortune 500 allow their employees to volunteer during work hours. These formalized Employee Volunteering Programs (EVPs), also called Employer Supported Volunteering (ESV), are regarded as a part of the companies' sustainability efforts and their social responsibility activities. About 40% of Fortune 500 companies provide monetary donations, also known as volunteer grants, to nonprofits as a way to recognize employees who dedicate significant amounts of time to volunteering in the community.

According to the information from VolunteerMatch, a service that provides Employee Volunteering Program solutions, the key drivers for companies that produce and manage EVPs are building brand awareness and affinity, strengthening trust and loyalty among consumers, enhancing corporate image and reputation, improving employee retention, increasing employee productivity and loyalty, and providing an effective vehicle to reach strategic goals.

In April 2015, David Cameron pledged to give all UK workers employed by companies with more 250 staff mandatory three days' paid volunteering leave, which if implemented will generate an extra 360 million volunteering hours a year.

=== Community volunteer work ===
Volunteers fit new windows at the Sumac Centre in Nottingham, England, UK.

Community volunteering, in the US called "community service", refers globally to those who work to improve their local community. This activity commonly occurs through not for profit organizations, local governments and churches; but also encompasses ad-hoc or informal groups such as recreational sports teams.

=== Social volunteering or welfare volunteering ===
In some European countries government organisations and non-government organisations provide auxiliary positions for a certain period in institutions like hospitals, schools, memorial sites and welfare institutions. The difference to other types of volunteering is that there are strict legal regulations, what organisation is allowed to engage volunteers and about the period a volunteer is allowed to work in a voluntary position. Due to that fact, the volunteer is getting a limited amount as a pocket money from the government. Organizations having the biggest manpower in Europe are the Voluntary social year (German: Freiwilliges Soziales Jahr), with more than 50.000 volunteers per year, and the Federal volunteers service (German: Bundesfreiwilligendienst), with about 30.000 to 40.000 volunteers per year.

=== Volunteering at World Youth Day ===
Since its first edition in 1986, World Youth Day (WYD) has been built with the collaboration of thousands of volunteers. There are different types of volunteers, each assigned specific tasks, such as welcoming pilgrims, providing translation services, serving at information points, supporting security teams, distributing food, and performing many other relevant functions. The purpose of WYD is faith-based.

=== Volunteering at major sporting events ===
25,000 volunteers worked at the 2014 Sochi Winter Olympics. They supported the organisers in more than 20 functional areas: meeting guests, assisting navigation, organising the opening and closing ceremonies, organising food outlets, etc. Volunteer applications were open to any nationals of Russia and other countries. The Sochi 2014 Organising Committee received about 200,000 applications, 8 applicants per place. Volunteers received training over the course of more than a year at 26 volunteer centres in 17 cities across Russia. The majority of participants were between 17 and 22 years old. At the same time, 3000 applications were submitted from people over 55 years old. Some of them worked as volunteers during the 1980 Olympics in Moscow. It was the first experience with such a large-scale volunteer program in the contemporary Russia.

The FIFA World Cup in 2018 was supported by 17,040 volunteers of the Russia 2018 Local Organising Committee.

=== Medical Volunteering ===
Volunteering in the context of delivering medical care is referred to as medical volunteering. In general, medical volunteering has been lauded as a "ethical responsibility to aid the needy". The activities are often offered by both for profit and not for profit associations. Medical volunteers typically participate in unpaid medical volunteer programs in hospitals, clinics, and underserved areas. Typically, these regions are in underdeveloped nations or nations battling natural disasters, sickness, or violence. These activities typically involve volunteer physicians and nurses. Dental volunteering is a part of medical volunteering which predominantly focused on dental care.

=== Heritage Volunteering ===
Recent research from Historic England has looked at how and why heritage participation is associated with wellbeing. Analysis showed that activities funded to benefit heritage can also benefit wellbeing, and that the aspects of wellbeing most often or strongly associated with heritage are those relating to purpose, being, knowledge gain, sharing, psychological benefit and self-actualisation. The USP of heritage for wellbeing appears to lie in the interaction of eight cross-cutting characteristics (temporality, discovery, authenticity, continuity, rescue, nostalgia, transformation and legacy) which are present in the time-focussed eco-system of heritage volunteering.

=== Seva ===
In Hinduism, seva means selfless service and is often associated with karma yoga, disciplined action, and bhakti yoga, disciplined devotion. Seva is also connected to other Sanskrit concepts such as dāna (gift giving), karunā (compassion), and preman (kindness). Seva is also performed as a form of ego-transcending spiritual practise known as Sadhana, and plays a large role in modern Hinduism. This is because a key concept in Hinduism is liberation (Moksha) from the cycle of births and deaths (Saṃsāra), and sadhana is the effort one makes to strive for liberation, highlighting the importance of service to others.

In Sikhism, the word seva also means "to worship, to adore, to pay homage through the act of love." In the writings of Sikh gurus, these two meanings of seva (service and worship) have been merged. Seva is expected to be a labour of love performed without desire and intention, and with humility.

== Volunteer days, weeks and years ==
Designated days, weeks and years observed by a country or as designated by the United Nations to encourage volunteering / community service

- Global Youth Service Day
- International Volunteer Day
- International Year of Volunteers
- Join Hands Day
- Mandela Day
- MLK Day of service
- Mitzvah Day
- Random Acts of Kindness Day
- Sewa Day
- Make A Difference Day
- World Kindness Day

== Political view ==
Modern societies share a common value of people helping each other; not only do volunteer acts assist others, but they also benefit the volunteering individual on a personal level. Despite having similar objectives, tension can arise between volunteers and state-provided services. In order to curtail this tension, most countries develop policies and enact legislation to clarify the roles and relationships among governmental stakeholders and their voluntary counterparts; this regulation identifies and allocates the necessary legal, social, administrative, and financial support of each party. This is particularly necessary when some voluntary activities are seen as a challenge to the authority of the state (e.g., on 29 January 2001, President Bush cautioned that volunteer groups should supplement—not replace—government agencies' work).

Volunteering that benefits the state but challenges paid counterparts angers labor unions that represent those who are paid for their volunteer work; this is particularly seen in combination departments, such as volunteer fire departments.

=== Difficulties in cross-national aid ===
Difficulties in the cross-national aid model of volunteering can arise when it is applied across national borders. The presence of volunteers who are sent from one state to another can be viewed as a breach of sovereignty and showing a lack of respect towards the national government of the proposed recipients. Thus, motivations are important when states negotiate offers to send aid and when these proposals are accepted, particularly if donors may postpone assistance or stop it altogether. Three types of conditionality have evolved:

1. Financial accountability: Transparency in funding management to ensure that what is done by the volunteers is properly targeted
2. Policy reform: Governmental request that developing countries adopt certain social, economic, or environmental policies; often, the most controversial relate to the privatization of services traditionally offered by the state
3. Development objectives: Asking developing countries to adjust specific time-bound economic objectives

Some international volunteer organizations define their primary mission as being altruistic: to fight poverty and improve the living standards of people in the developing world, (e.g. Voluntary Services Overseas has almost 2,000 skilled professionals working as volunteers to pass on their expertise to local people so that the volunteers' skills remain long after they return home). When these organizations work in partnership with governments, the results can be impressive. However, when other organizations or individual First World governments support the work of volunteer groups, there can be questions as to whether the organizations' or governments' real motives are poverty alleviation. Instead, a focus on creating wealth for some of the poor or developing policies intended to benefit the donor states is sometimes reported. Many low-income countries' economies suffer from industrialization without prosperity and investment without growth. One reason for this is that development assistance guides many Third World governments to pursue development policies that have been wasteful, ill-conceived, or unproductive; some of these policies have been so destructive that the economies could not have been sustained without outside support.

Indeed, some offers of aid have distorted the general spirit of volunteering, treating local voluntary action as contributions in kind, i.e., existing conditions requiring the modification of local people's behavior in order for them to earn the right to donors' charity. This can be seen as patronizing and offensive to the recipients because the aid expressly serves the policy aims of the donors rather than the needs of the recipients.

== Moral resources, political capital and civil society ==
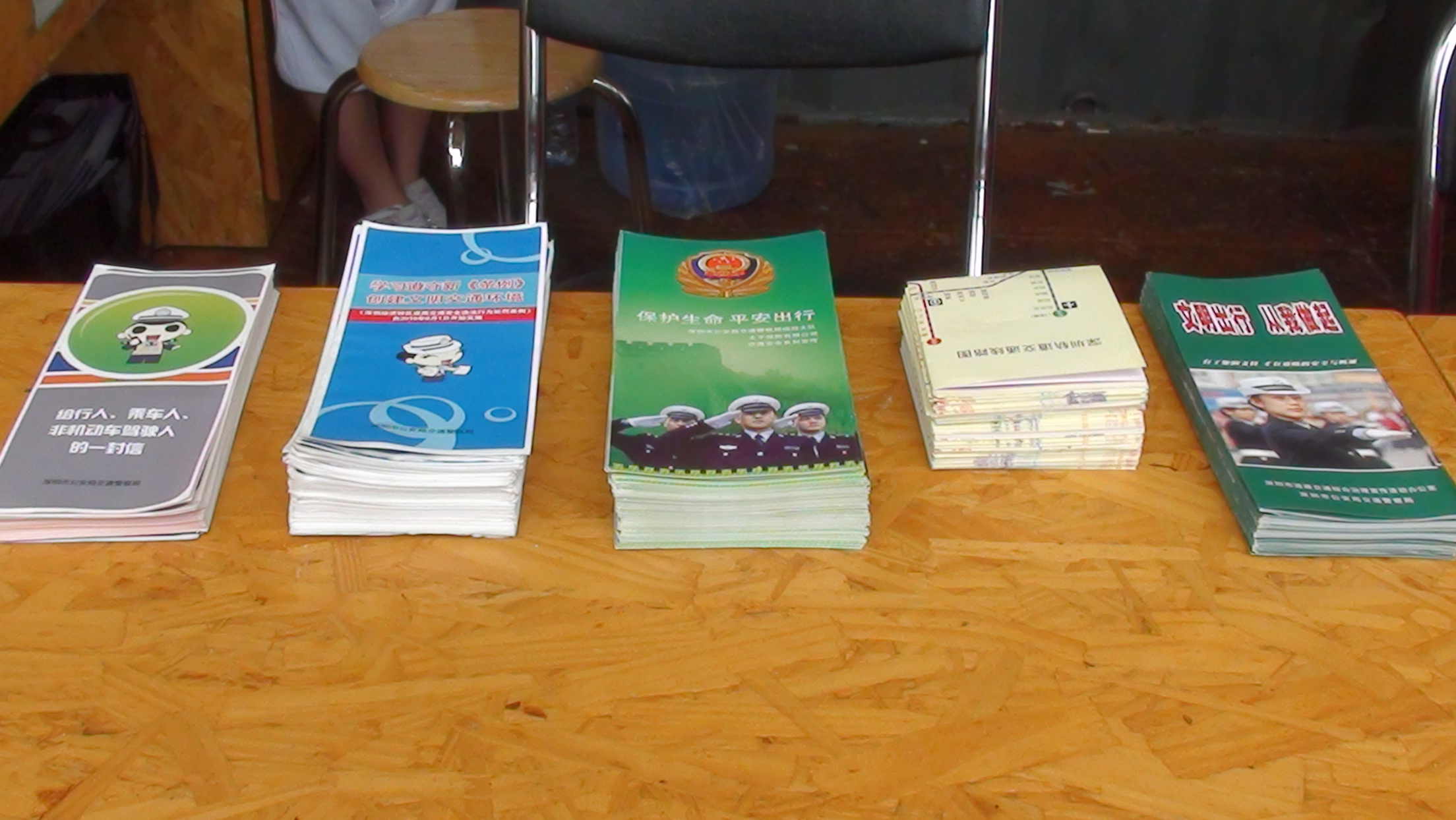
Some files for helping people in a volunteers station in Shenzhen, People's Republic of China

Based on a case study in China, Xu and Ngai (2011) revealed that the developing grassroots volunteerism can be an enclave among various organizations and may be able to work toward the development of civil society in the developing countries. The researchers developed a "Moral Resources and Political Capital" approach to examine the contributions of volunteerism in promoting the civil society. Moral resource means the available morals could be chosen by NGOs. Political capital means the capital that will improve or enhance the NGOs' status, possession or access in the existing political system.

Moreover, Xu and Ngai (2011) distinguished two types of Moral Resources: Moral Resource-I and Moral Resource-II (ibid).

1. Moral Resource I: Inspired by Immanuel Kant's (1998 [1787]) argument of "What ought I to do," Moral Resource-I will encourage the NGOs' confidence and then have the courage to act and conquer difficulties by way of answering and confirming the question of "What ought I to do."
2. Moral Resource II: given that Adorno (2000) recognizes that moral or immoral tropes are socially determined, Moral Resource-II refers to the morals that are well accepted by the given society.

Thanks to the intellectual heritage of Blau and Duncan (1967), two types of political capital were identified:

1. Political Capital-I refers to the political capital mainly ascribed to the status that the NGO inherited throughout history (e.g., the CYL).
2. Political Capital-II refers to the Political Capital that the NGOs earned through their hard efforts.

Obviously, "Moral resource-I itself contains the self-determination that gives participants confidence in the ethical beliefs they have chosen", almost any organizations may have Moral Resource-I, while not all of them have the societal recognized Moral Resource-II. However, the voluntary service organizations predominantly occupy Moral Resource-II because a sense of moral superiority makes it possible that for parties with different values, goals and cultures to work together in promoting the promotion of volunteering. Thus the voluntary service organizations are likely to win the trust and support of the masses as well as the government more easily than will the organizations whose morals are not accepted by mainstream society. In other words, Moral Resource II helps the grassroots organizations with little Political Capital I to win Political Capital-II, which is a crucial factor for their survival and growth in developing countries such as China. Therefore, the voluntary service realm could be an enclave of the development of civil society in the developing nations.

== Potential benefits of volunteering ==
=== Academic ===
Volunteering for community service as part of a college curriculum (service-learning) provides opportunities for students to surround themselves with new people which helps them learn how to work together as a group, improve teamwork and relational skills, reduce stereotypes, and increases appreciation of other cultures. Students participating in service-learning programs are shown to have more positive attitudes toward self, attitudes toward school and learning, civic engagement, social skills, and academic performance. They are also more likely to complete their degree.

=== Longevity ===
Volunteers are observed to have a reduced mortality risk compared to non-volunteers. Therefore, the various types of work as a volunteer and psychological effects of such altruistic work may produce enough side-effects to contribute to a longer and more fulfilling life. A systematic review shows that adults over age of 65 years who volunteer may experience improved physical and mental health and potentially reduced mortality.

=== Mental health ===
A worldwide survey was conducted in a study, suggesting that people who experience the highest levels of happiness are the most successful in terms of close relationships and volunteer work. In comparison, charity in the form of monetary donations, which is another form of altruism (volunteering being one of them) is also known to have a similar effect. Another study finds that helping others is associated with higher levels of mental health, above and beyond the benefits of receiving help. This is true across age groups. Observational evidence indicates that volunteering helps improve the mental health of adolescents. Moreover, on the subject of service-learning, undergraduate students who volunteered 1 to 9 hours per week were less likely to feel depressed than students who did not volunteer. Among people aged 65 years old or above, volunteering may reduce the risk of depression.

Volunteering in the aftermath of the 2011 Christchurch Earthquake was found to build social capital, increasing the social connectedness of individuals as well as community wellbeing. The researchers suggested healthcare professionals could prescribe volunteering to improve the health of individuals.

== Statistics ==
In the United States, statistics on volunteering have historically been limited, according to volunteerism expert Susan J. Ellis. In 2013, the U.S. Current Population Survey included a volunteering supplement which produced statistics on volunteering.

== Barriers to volunteering ==
The UK's National Council for Voluntary Organisations (NCVO) has identified reluctance to enter into an ongoing commitment and work, study and other competing personal activities as barriers affecting willingness to volunteer. The Scout Association in the UK also recognises that finance and accessibility can also act as barriers.

== Criticisms ==
In the 1960s, Ivan Illich offered an analysis of the role of American volunteers in Mexico in his speech entitled "To Hell With Good Intentions". His concerns, along with those of critics such as Paulo Freire and Edward Said, revolve around the notion of altruism as an extension of Christian missionary ideology. In addition, he mentions the sense of responsibility/obligation as a factor, which drives the concept of noblesse oblige—first developed by the French aristocracy as a moral duty derived from their wealth. Simply stated, these apprehensions propose the extension of power and authority over indigenous cultures around the world. Recent critiques of volunteering come from Westmier and Kahn (1996) and bell hooks (née Gloria Watkins) (2004). Also, Georgeou (2012) has critiqued the impact of neoliberalism on international aid volunteering.

The field of the medical tourism (referring to volunteers who travel overseas to deliver medical care) has recently attracted negative criticism when compared to the alternative notion of sustainable capacities, i.e., work done in the context of long-term, locally-run, and foreign-supported infrastructures. A preponderance of this criticism appears largely in scientific and peer-reviewed literature. Recently, media outlets with more general readerships have published such criticisms as well. This type of volunteering is pejoratively referred to as "medical voluntourism".

Another problem noted with volunteering is that it can be used to replace low paid entry positions. This can act to decrease social mobility, with only those capable of affording to work without payment able to gain the experience. Trade unions in the United Kingdom (UK) have warned that long term volunteering is a form of exploitation, used by charities to avoid minimum wage legislation. Some sectors now expect candidates for paid roles to have undergone significant periods of volunteer experience whether relevant to the role or not, setting up 'Volunteer Credentialism'.

Volunteers can be exposed to stressful situations and attitudes, which can cause them to suffer from burnout which in turn reduces their activism and overall well-being. There is also a clear evidence that volunteering can become a moral obligation that prompts feelings of guilt when not performed.

== Volunteering organizations in the United States ==
Habitat for Humanity locations

- American Red Cross
- Cajun Navy
- Catholic Charities USA
- Chaverim
- Endeavors (non-profit)
- Feeding America
- Habitat for Humanity
- JC's Girls
- Keep Indianapolis Beautiful
- Master gardener program
- National CleanUp Day
- Neighborhood association
- New Mexico Mounted Patrol
- Orchestra Society of Philadelphia
- Peace Corps
- Points of Light
- Reach Out Worldwide
- Rotary International
- Salvation Army
- Shomrim (neighborhood watch group)
- Team Rubicon
- Volunteer Center of North Texas
- Volunteers of America
- Wikipedia Wikipedians
- Yad Leah

== See also ==
- Association for Leaders in Volunteer Engagement (AL!VE)
- Association for Volunteer Administration (AVA)
- Avocation
- Community service
- Crossing guard
- European Solidarity Corps
- Federal volunteers service
- Helping behavior
- Intentional living
- International volunteering
- List of volunteer awards
- Micro-volunteering
- Mutual aid
- Peace Corps
- Pro bono
- Prosocial behavior
- Subbotnik
- Scout leader
- Technisches Hilfswerk (THW)
- Unpaid work
- Volunteer health practitioner
- Voluntary social year
