= Volunteer Functions Inventory =

Research method

The Volunteer Functions Inventory (VFI) is a research method for assessing volunteer motivations. The model has been developed by Clary et al. in 1998.

== Assumptions ==
1. People are purposeful, planful, goal-directed—Volunteers engage in volunteer work in order to satisfy important personal goals
2. Different people may do similar things for different reasons—Volunteers performing the same volunteer activity for the same organization may have different reasons for volunteering
3. Any one individual may be motivated by more than one need or goal—An individual volunteer may be attempting to satisfy two or more motives through one activity at your organization
4. Outcomes depend on the matching of needs and goals to the opportunities afforded by the environment – Successful volunteer recruitment, satisfaction, and retention is tied to the ability of the volunteer experience to fulfil the volunteer's important motives

== Motivations for volunteering ==
Function	Description
Values	expressing or acting on important values, such as humanitarianism and helping those less fortunate
Understanding	seeking to learn more about the world and/or exercise skills that are often unused
Enhancement	seeking to grow and develop psychologically through involvement in volunteering
Career	goal of gaining career-related experience through volunteering
Social	volunteering allows the person to strengthen one's social relationships
Protective	volunteering to reduce negative feelings, such as guilt, or to address personal problems

== Findings ==
Having analyzed several dozens of studies using this framework, Chacón et al. found that the most common motivation for volunteering is the values dimension, and the least, career and enhancement ones. Career and understanding motivations decrease with the mean age of volunteers, and men seem to be more likely to consider the social dimension than women.
