= Yad Leah =

- Formation: 2004
- Type: Non-profit; NGO
- Purpose: Alleviating poverty
- Headquarters: New Jersey
- Region served: Israel
- Director: Jessica Katz
- Staff: 1
- Volunteers: 100s
- Website: www.yadleah.org

Yad Leah is a volunteer-based 501(c)(3) non-profit organization which sends clothing to poor families in Israel. It was founded in 2004 by Passaic resident Jessica Katz and Beitar Illit resident Karen Milch Thaler. It distributes hundreds of thousands of articles of clothing to over 25 communities annually. Yad Leah has a volunteer center located in Passaic, NJ where volunteers can pack and sort donated clothing.
