= List of hospitals in Nicaragua =

This is a list of hospitals in Nicaragua.

- Bautista Hospital
- Bertha Calderón (De la Mujer) Hospital
- Carlos Marx (Alemán-Nicaragüense) Hospital
- Alejandro Davila Bolaños Hospital (Military)
- Japanese-Nicaraguan Hospital (Hospital Japonés-Nicaragüense)
- Manuel de Jesús Rivera,"La Mascota" Hospital
- Antonio Lenin Fonseca (Trauma) Hospital
- Manolo Morales (Roberto Calderón) Hospital
- Hospital Salud Integral
- Metropolitano Vivian Pellas Private Hospital (for-profit institution)
- Psychiatric Hospital
- Fernando Vélez Paiz, Pediatric Hospital
- La Mascota Pediatric Hospital
- Hospital Regional Santiago (Jinotepe, Carazo)
- Hospital San José (Diriamba, Carazo)
- Hospital Santa Gema, Masaya (offers 24hr emergency)
- Hospital Militar
- Hospital Primario Héroes y Mártires de Ometepe.
