= Thiran =

Thiran may refer to:

- Thiran Dhanapala, Sri Lankan cricketera
- Patrick Thiran, Swiss engineer
