= Urbanke =

Urbanke is a surname. Notable people with the surname include:

- Bianca Urbanke (born 1967), German handball player
- Rüdiger Urbanke (born 1966), Austrian computer scientist
