= Babak Falsafi =

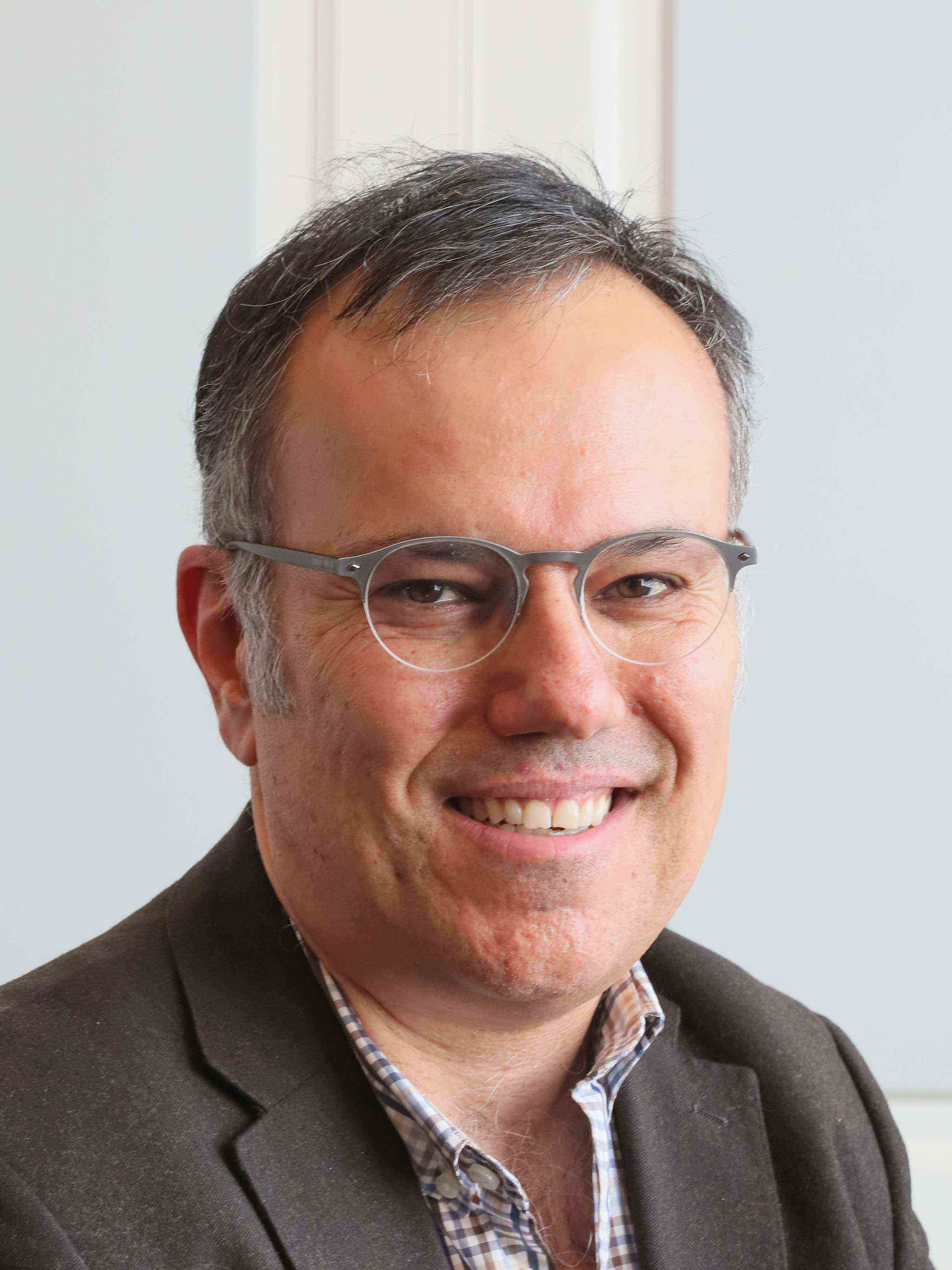
Babak Falsafi

Babak Falsafi is a Swiss computer scientist specializing in computer architecture and digital platform design. He is the founding director of EcoCloud at EPFL, an industrial/academic consortium investigating efficient and intelligent data-centric technologies. He is a professor in the School of Computer and Communication Sciences at EPFL. Prior to that he was a professor of electrical and computer engineering at Carnegie Mellon University, and an assistant professor of electrical and computer engineering at Purdue University. He holds a bachelor's degree in computer science, a bachelor's degree in electrical and computer engineering (both summa cum laude) with distinctions from SUNY Buffalo, and a master's degree and PhD in computer science from University Wisconsin - Madison.

He has made numerous contributions to computer system design and evaluation including a server architecture which laid the foundation for Sun Microsystems' NUMA machines, technologies to minimize (leakage) power in the memory system in the absence of activity (Supply Gating) and in shared memory (Snoop Filtering) prevalent in modern CPUs and multi-socket servers, and memory system accelerators in modern (ARM) CPUs in mobile platforms. He has shown that hardware memory consistency models are neither necessary (in the 90's) nor sufficient (a decade later) to achieve high performance in multiprocessor systems. These results eventually led to fence speculation in modern (x86) CPUs. He argued and demonstrated that the slowdown in silicon efficiency (Dennard's Law) and density scaling (Moore's law) would lead to Dark Silicon and specialization in servers. These results led to a follow-on study on careful characterization of scale-out workloads on server platforms which laid the foundation for the first generation of Cavium ARM server CPUs, ThunderX.

He is a recipient of an Alfred P. Sloan Research Fellowship, was named an ACM Fellow in 2015 for contributions to multiprocessor and memory architecture design and evaluation and a Fellow of the Institute of Electrical and Electronics Engineers (IEEE) in 2012 for contributions to multiprocessor architecture and memory systems.
