= Alexandra Ros =

German biochemist

- Education: École polytechnique fédérale de Lausanne
- Scientific career
- Workplaces: Bielefeld University; Arizona State University
- Thesis: New protein separation and analysis techniques (2000)

Alexandra Ros is a German analytical chemist who is a professor in both the School of Molecular Sciences and Center for Applied Structural Discovery at The Biodesign Institute, Arizona State University. Her research considers microfluidic platforms and their use in analysis. She was awarded the 2020 Advancing Electrokinetic Science AES Electrophoresis Society Mid-Career Achievement Award.

== Early life and education ==
Ros was an undergraduate student at the Ruprecht-Karls University (now Heidelberg University) in Heidelberg. She majored in chemistry, and moved to the École Polytechnique Fédérale de Lausanne (EPFL) for doctoral research. Her doctoral research considered protein separation and analysis. After earning her doctorate, Ros moved to Bielefeld University, where she started to explore microfluidics. She completed her habilitation in 2007, and was awarded a Venia Legendi in experimental physics.

== Research and career ==
In 2008, Ros moved to the United States, where she was appointed to the faculty of Arizona State University. She was awarded a National Science Foundation CAREER Award. She was promoted to Associate Professor in 2014 and Professor in 2020. She spent 2015 as a Alexander von Humboldt Foundation Fellow at the University of Göttingen.

In 2018, Ros was awarded a Federation of Analytical Chemistry and Spectroscopy Societies (FACSS) innovation prize. The award allowed her to explore serial femtosecond crystallography using X-ray free-electron laser (XFELs). Serial femtosecond crystallography, SFX, can unravel the complicated structures of proteins with femto-second time resolution. Ultra-short, high intensity X-ray pulses can determine high-resolution protein structures before causing damage to the sample, so-called “diffraction before destruction”. The X-ray exposure can destroy the crystals being examined, such that thousands of diffraction patterns from multiple crystals must be acquired to obtain a full data set. Ros pioneered the development of microfluidic devices for SFX-XFEL sample delivery.

Ros was awarded the 2020 FACSS Advancing Electrokinetic Science (AES) Electrophoresis Society Mid-Career Achievement Award for her work in electrophoresis and microfluidics.

== Selected publications ==
- Christopher Kupitz; Shibom Basu; Ingo Grotjohann; et al. (11 September 2014). "Serial time-resolved crystallography of photosystem II using a femtosecond X-ray laser". Nature. 513 (7517): 261–5. doi:10.1038/nature13453. ISSN 1476-4687. PMC 4821544. PMID 25043005. Wikidata Q27643986.
- Jan Regtmeier; Thanh Tu Duong; Ralf Eichhorn; Dario Anselmetti; Alexandra Ros (20 April 2007). "Dielectrophoretic manipulation of DNA: separation and polarizability". Analytical Chemistry. 79 (10): 3925–3932. doi:10.1021/ac062431r. ISSN 0003-2700. PMID 17444613. Wikidata Q40221886.
- Wibke Hellmich; Jan Regtmeier; Thanh Tu Duong; Robert Ros; Dario Anselmetti; Alexandra Ros (1 August 2005). "Poly(oxyethylene) based surface coatings for poly(dimethylsiloxane) microchannels". Langmuir. 21 (16): 7551–7557. doi:10.1021/la0510432. ISSN 0743-7463. PMID 16042494. Wikidata Q46617612.
