= École Polytechnique Fédérale de Lausanne =

Public university in Lausanne, Switzerland

EPFL
- École Polytechnique Fédérale de Lausanne
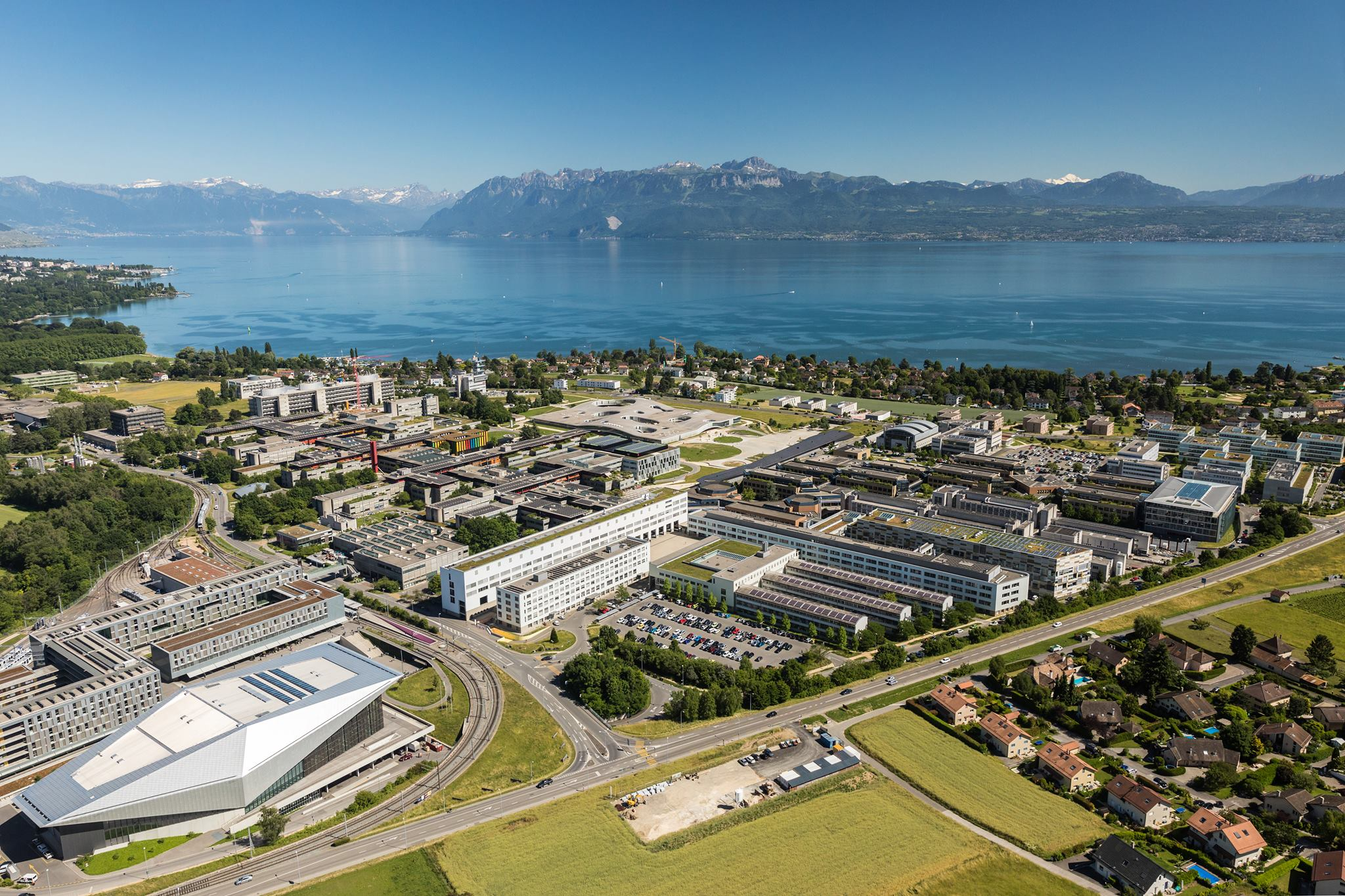
- EPFL campus
- Former names: École spéciale de Lausanne (1853–1869); École polytechnique de l'Université de Lausanne (1869–1969)
- Type: Public research university
- Established: 1 January 1969; 57 years ago
- Affiliations: AUF, CESAER, EUA, EuroTech, RESCIF and TIME
- Budget: 1,188 billion CHF (2025)
- President: Anna Fontcuberta i Morral
- Faculty: 378 professors 3,697 (other academic staff) (2025)
- Administrative staff: 2,367 (2025)
- Students: 14,072 (2025)
- Undergraduates: 7,001 (2025)
- Postgraduates: 7,071 (2025)
- Location: Écublens, Vaud, Switzerland; 46°31′13″N 6°33′56″E
- Campus: Urban, 136 acres (55.0 ha)
- Language: French, English
- Nationalities: 130+
- University press: EPFL Press
- Colours: Swiss red
- Website: epfl.ch

EPFL (official name, initialism for French: École Polytechnique Fédérale de Lausanne, lit. 'Federal School of Technology in Lausanne') is a public research university in Lausanne, Switzerland. Founded in 1969, the university primarily teaches and conducts research in science, technology, engineering, and mathematics (STEM) fields.

Like its sister institution ETH Zurich, EPFL is part of the Swiss Federal Institutes of Technology Domain, a consortium of universities and research institutes under the Swiss Federal Department of Economic Affairs, Education and Research. As of 2025, EPFL enrolled 14,072 students from over 130 countries.

Students, faculty, and researchers affiliated with EPFL include a Nobel Prize laureate, two Fields Medalists, two Pritzker Architecture Prize winners, and one Turing Award winner. EPFL has an urban campus that extends alongside Lake Geneva, and includes the EPFL Innovation Park as well as university research centers and affiliated laboratories.

== History ==
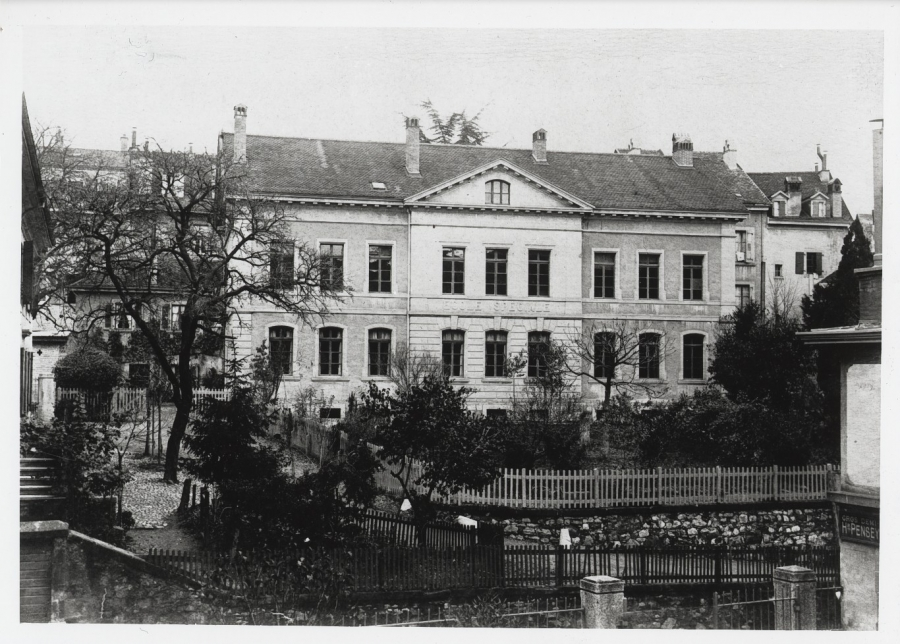
École spéciale de Lausanne, 1857

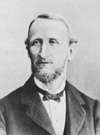
Louis Rivier, founding member of École spéciale de Lausanne

The roots of modern-day EPFL can be traced back to the foundation of a private school under the name École spéciale de Lausanne in 1853 at the initiative of Louis Rivier, a graduate of the École Centrale Paris and John Gay, the then professor and rector of the Académie de Lausanne. At its inception it had only 11 students and the offices was located at Rue du Valentin in Lausanne.

In 1869, it became the technical department of the Académie de Lausanne. When the Académie was reorganized and acquired the status of a university in 1890, the technical faculty changed its name to École d'ingénieurs de l'Université de Lausanne. In 1946, it was renamed the École polytechnique de l'Université de Lausanne (EPUL). In 1969, the EPUL was separated from the rest of the University of Lausanne and became a federal institute under its current name. EPFL, like ETH Zurich, is thus directly controlled by the Swiss Federal Council.

In contrast, all other universities in Switzerland are controlled by their respective cantonal governments. Following the nomination of Patrick Aebischer as president in 2000, EPFL has started to develop into the field of life sciences. It absorbed the Swiss Institute for Experimental Cancer Research (ISREC) in 2008.

In 1946, there were 360 students at EPFL. In 1969, the university had grown to 1,400 students and 55 faculty members.

In the past two decades, EPFL has grown rapidly in reputation and size. As of 2023, EPFL has more than 13,000 full-time students.

The environment at modern day EPFL is highly international with the school attracting students and researchers from all over the world. More than 125 countries are represented on the campus and the university has two official languages, French and English.

== Academics ==
=== Admission ===
Holders of a Swiss "maturité gymnasiale" are directly accepted with no other condition in the first year of their Bachelor's program of choice.

Holders of a Swiss Professional "Maturité" or a Swiss specialised "Maturité" are accepted in the Cours de mathématiques spéciales within the places available.

As such, EPFL is not selective in its undergraduate admission procedure for Swiss residents.

However, international students are required to have a final grade average of 80% or above of the maximum grade of the upper secondary school national system.

The real selection process happens during the first year of undergraduate studies. This period is called the propaedeutic cycle and the students must pass a block examination of all the courses taken during the first year at the end of the cycle.

If the weighted average is insufficient, a student is required to retake the entire first year of coursework if they wish to continue their studies at EPFL. Roughly 60% of students fail the first year at EPFL all majors combined, and many choose to drop out rather than to repeat the propaedeutic cycle.

The failure rate differs between majors, it is higher for Life Sciences Engineering, Physics, Mathematics and Electrical Engineering where only 30–40% of students pass the first year.

For foreign students, the selection procedure towards the undergraduate program is rather strict, and since most undergraduate courses are taught in French, foreign students must provide documentation of having acquired a level B2 proficiency in French as measured on the CEFR scale, though C1 proficiency is recommended.

The usual time till graduation is six semesters (3 years) for the Bachelor of Science degree and four additional semesters (2 years) for the Master of Science degree with the final semester dedicated to writing a thesis. Though only 58% of the students who manage to graduate are able to graduate within this time-period.

The possibility to study abroad for one or two semesters is offered during the 3rd year of studies as EPFL maintains several long-standing student exchange programs, such as the junior year engineering and science program with Carnegie Mellon University in the United States, as well as a graduate Aeronautics and Aerospace program with the ISAE in France.

Entrepreneurship is actively encouraged at EPFL, as evident by the EPFL Innovation Park being an integral part of the campus. Since 1997, 12 start-ups have been created per year on average by EPFL students and faculty. In the year 2013, a total of 105 million CHF was raised by EPFL start-ups.

=== Rankings ===
University rankings
- Ecole polytechnique fédérale de Lausanne

Global – Overall
- ARWU World: 54 (2023)
- QS World: 26 (2025)
- Reuters World: 12 (2018)
- RUR World: 19 (2023)
- THE World: 33 (2024)

In 2023, the QS World University Rankings ranks EPFL 16th worldwide across all fields, and among the 10 best universities in several engineering disciplines. Times Higher Education ranks EPFL as the world's 19th best school in the world for Engineering and Technology.

EPFL typically scores high on faculty to student ratio, international outlook and scientific impact. The CWTS Leiden Ranking that "aims to provide highly accurate measurements of the scientific impact of universities" ranks EPFL world 13th, and 1st in Europe in the 2013 rankings for all the sciences.

The Times 100 Under 50 Rankings is a ranking of the top 100 universities in the world under 50 years old. Since EPFL in its current form was formed in 1969, it is included in this ranking, and was ranked 1st in the world for three years in a row in 2015, 2016 and 2017, and 2nd in the world in 2018 and 2019.

Times Higher Education also ranked EPFL as the most international university in the world two years in a row 2014 and 2015.

== Campus ==
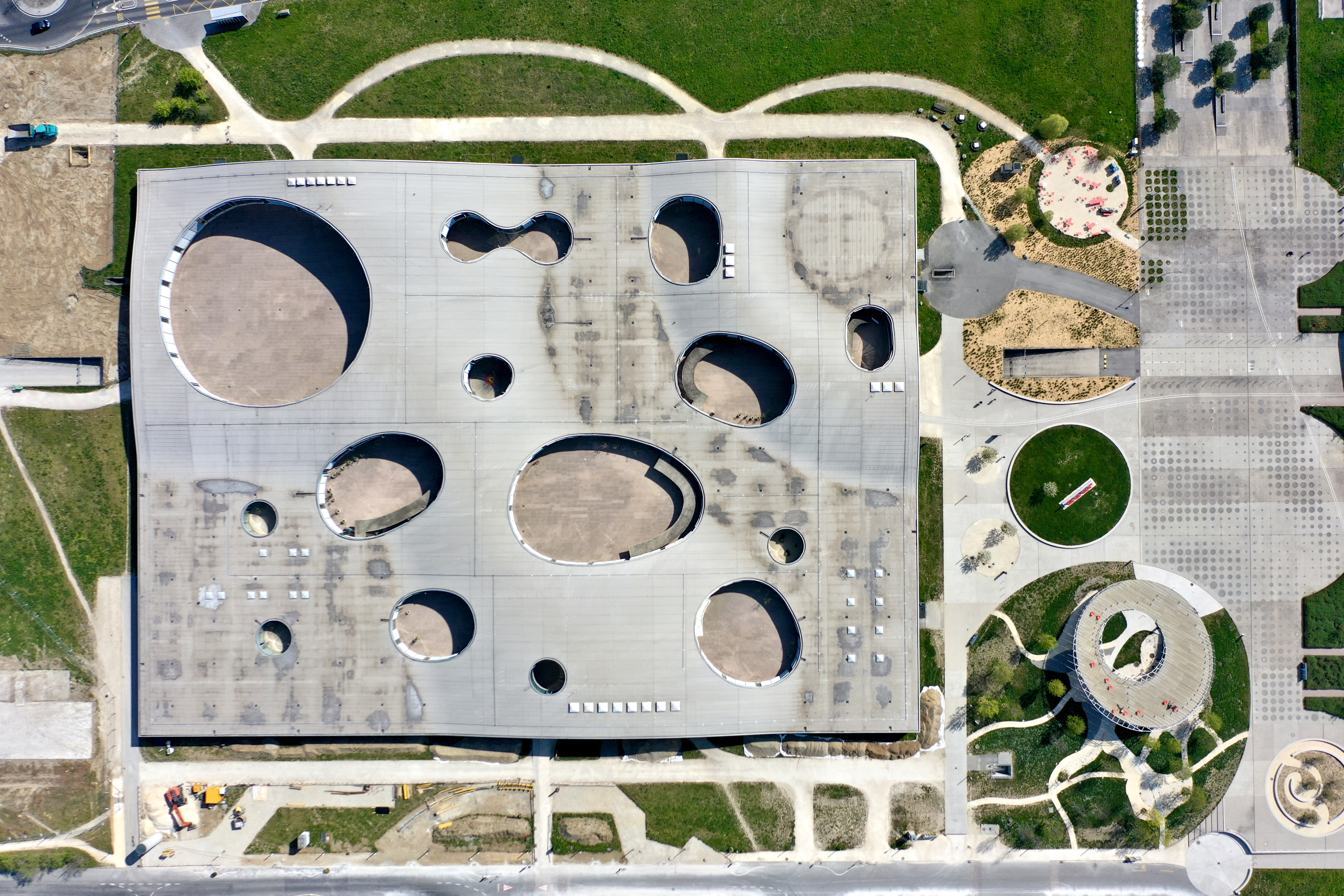
An aerial view of the EPFL Learning Center

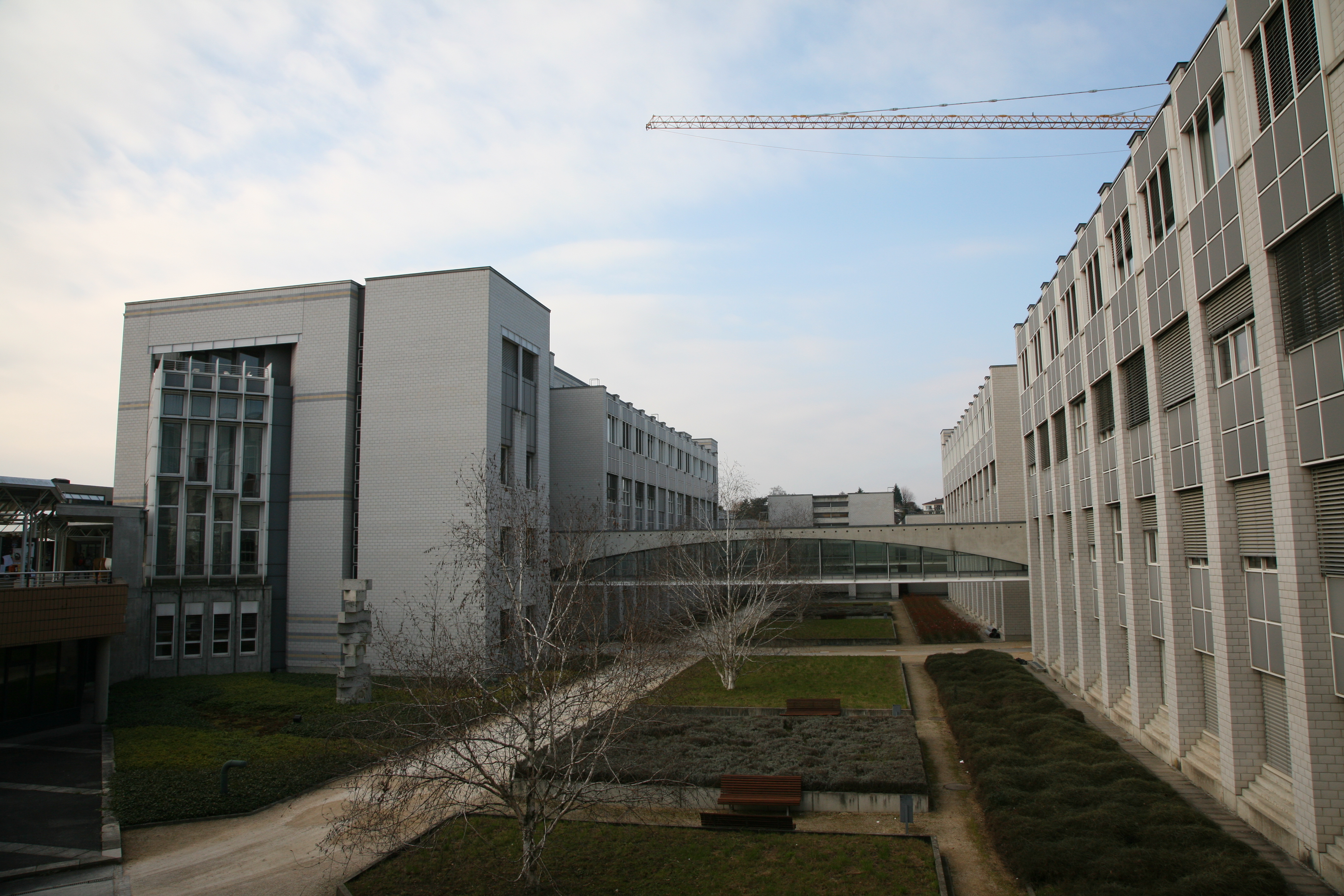
The MX buildings

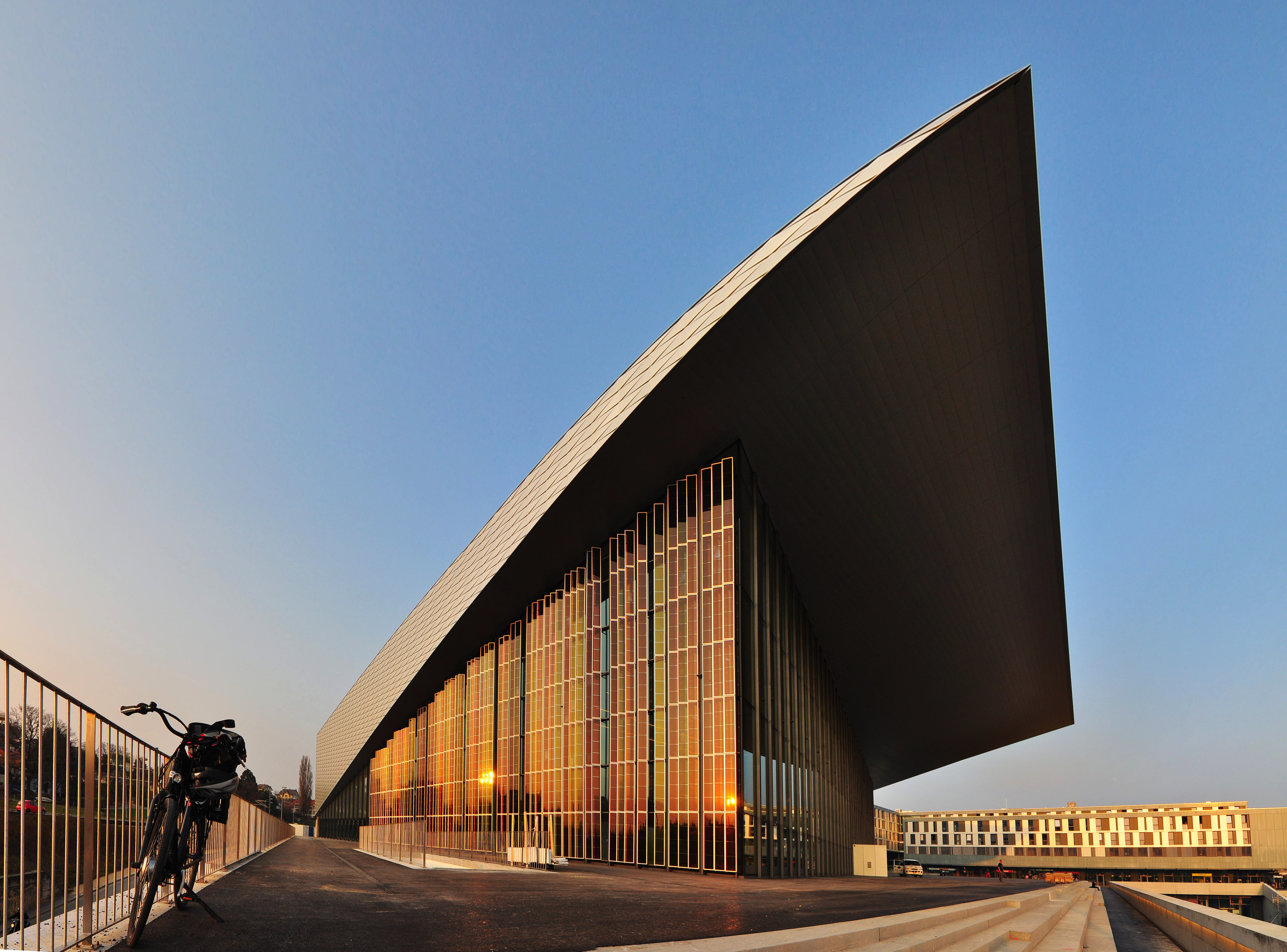
The SwissTech Convention Center

The École d'ingénieurs de l'Université de Lausanne, from which EPFL in its modern-day form originates, was located in the centre of Lausanne. In 1974, five years after EPFL was separated from University of Lausanne and became a federal institute under its current name, the construction of a new campus at Dorigny in Écublens, began. The inauguration of the first EPFL buildings of the new campus took place in 1978.

The EPFL campus has been evolving ever since. The first stage of development, with a total budget of 462 million Swiss francs, was completed in 1984; the second in 1990.

Construction of the northern parts of campus began in 1995 with the Microtechnology building (BM), completed in 1998, and the architecture building (SG), completed in 2000. In 2002, the department of architecture also moved to the campus in Écublens, uniting all departments of EPFL on the same site. The latest addition to the EPFL campus is the Rolex Learning Center completed in February 2010. The Rolex Learning Center is the main campus library and includes areas for work, leisure and services and is located at the centre of the campus. The campus has also been expanded with the construction of the SwissTech Convention Center inaugurated in March 2014. As of 2022, RTS began the construction of a regional production centre on campus in collaboration with EPFL.

Together with the University of Lausanne, EPFL forms a vast campus complex at the shores of Lake Geneva with about 20,000 students combined.

The campus is served by Lausanne Metro Line M1 and is equipped with an electric bicycle sharing system. Since 2012, only electricity from certified hydroelectric generation is being bought by EPFL to power its campus. The university was the first campus to receive the International Sustainable Campus Excellence Award by the International Sustainable Campus Network.

Of the 14,000 people that work and study at the École Polytechnique Fédérale de Lausanne campus, roughly 9,300 are students in either Bachelor, Master or Doctoral programs, the remaining 4,700 being administrative staff, scientists, technical staff, professors and the entrepreneurs located in the Science Park EPFL7. More than 125 nationalities are represented on campus with 48% of the student population being foreign nationals.

Almost all of the structures are on its main campus. However, it also has branches in Neuchâtel ("Microcity"), in Sion ("Pôle EPFL Valais"), in Geneva (Campus Biotech, including the Wyss Center for Bio- and Neuro-engineering) and in Fribourg ("Smart Living Lab"). There was also a research centre in Ras al-Khaimah (United Arab Emirates), EPFL Middle East, between 2009 and 2022.

=== Buildings ===
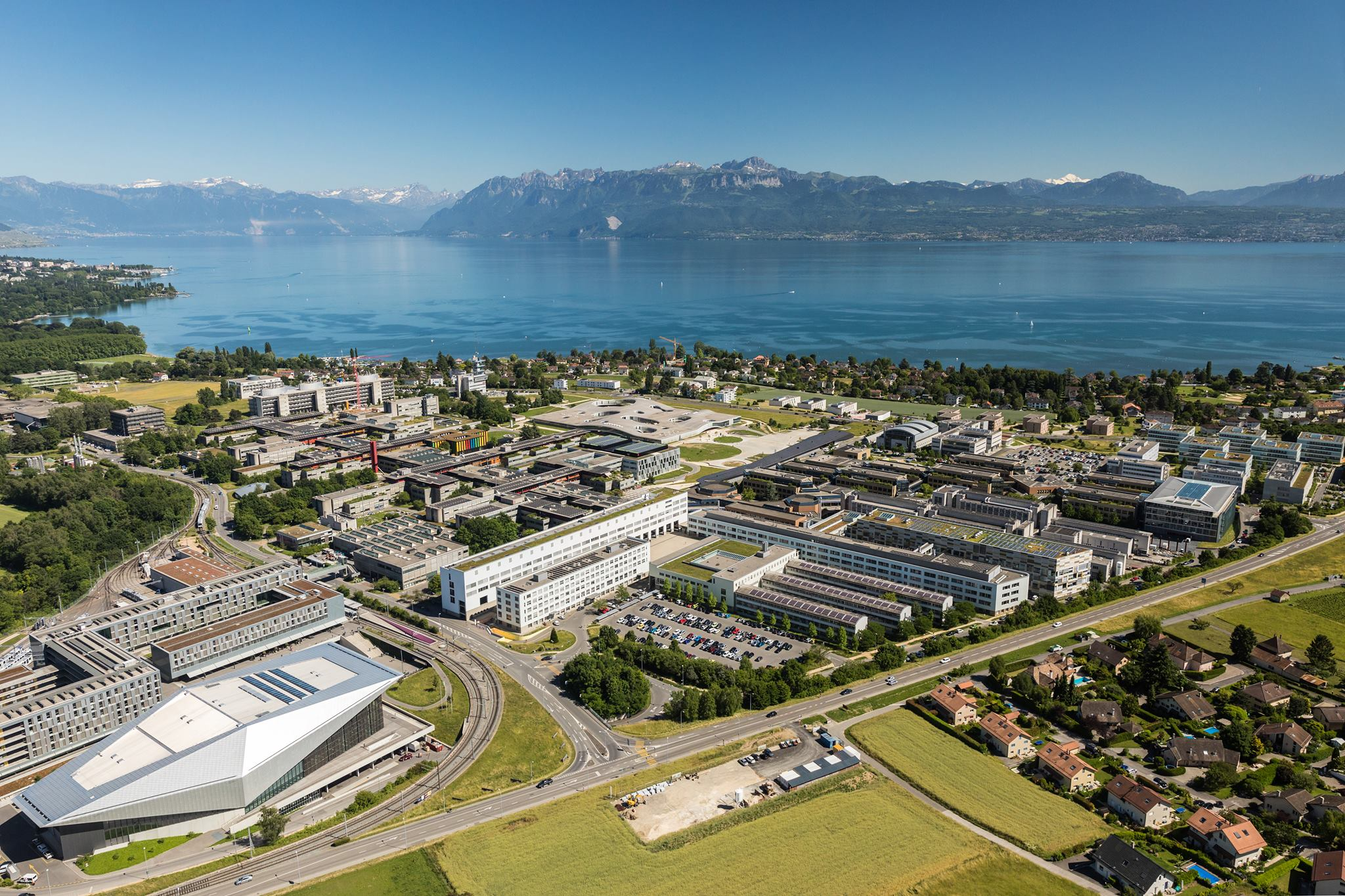
Aerial view of the EPFL, which forms a large campus with the University of Lausanne (UNIL) at the shores of Lake Geneva

The campus consists of about 65 buildings on 55 hectares (136 acres). Built according to the growth of the school, the campus includes different types of architectures:

- Late 1970s–1980s: modularised building, used today by the Schools of Basic Sciences and Architecture, Civil and Environmental Engineering, Mechanical and Electrical Engineering.
- 1990s: buildings with institutes from the Schools of Engineering Sciences and Techniques, Computer and Communication Sciences, and the Scientific Park (PSE).
- Modern: new buildings (2002–2004) with Microengineering, Communications and Architecture institutes, the School of Life Sciences and the College of Management.
- The Rolex Learning Center, a new library (2010).
- 2014: The SwissTech Convention Center and the "Quartier Nord" (convention centre, student accommodation, shops...).
- The EPFL-Pavilions building (previously Artlab), designed by Japanese architect Kengo Kuma, was opened in November 2016; it includes three spaces opened to the public. The first one hosts archives from the Montreux Jazz Festival; the second is a space for museum experimentations. The third space, named DataSquare, hosts an exposition on Big data, illustrated by two scientific projects from EPFL: the Human Brain Project and the Venice Time Machine.
- Museums: Musée Bolo, Archizoom (EPFL).

The EPFL and the University of Lausanne share an active sports centre on the shores of Lake Geneva, 1,250 metres (4,100 ft; 1.25 km; 0.78 mi) away from EPFL, about five minutes by car.

=== Associated campuses ===
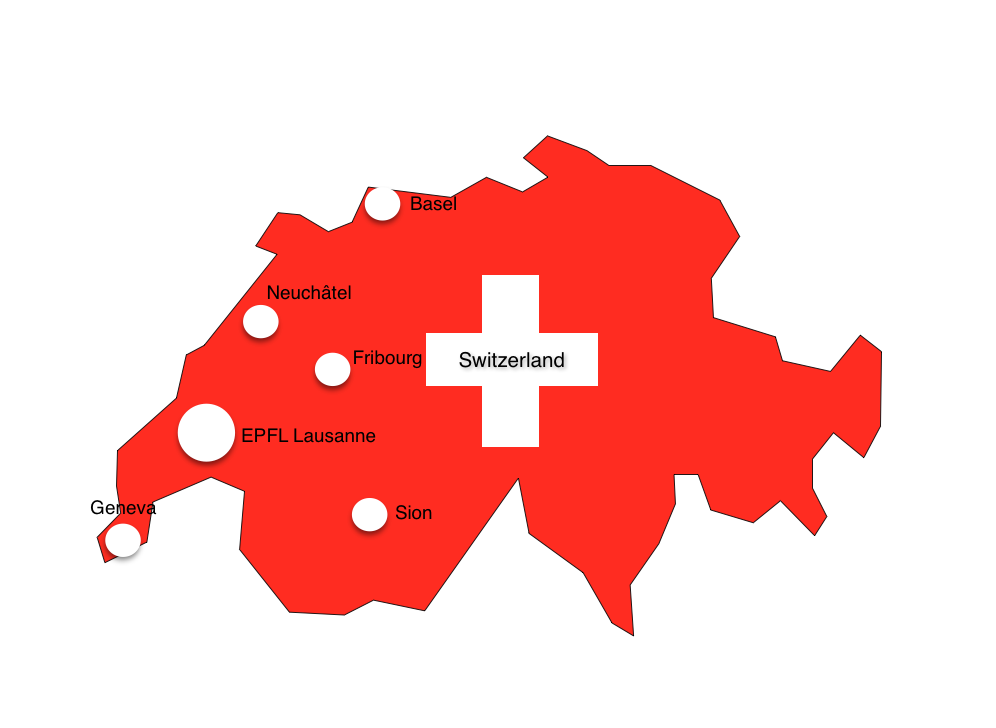
EPFL Lausanne

Beyond its main campus, EPFL operates a network of associated campuses in Western Switzerland, often sharing these spaces with partner academic institutions and hospitals:

- Fribourg: Smart Living Lab
- Neuchâtel: Microcity
- Geneva: Campus Biotech
- Sion: EPFL Valais/Wallis

=== Language Centre ===
The Language Centre offers language and communication modules for French, German, Italian and English (CEFR levels A1 to C2) to enable learners to participate more effectively in academic, professional and social situations in an internationalized multilingual and multicultural context. These modules are reserved for EPFL students, staff members and for their spouses.

Tandems are also organized and set up within the framework of the Tandem Program of the Faculty of Arts/EFLE of the University of Lausanne. This concept includes two people of different first languages meeting regularly to teach each other their respective language.

== Students and traditions ==
=== Student body ===
The number of students at EPFL has been rising heavily since EPFL was formed in 1969 under its current name. In 1969 EPFL had roughly 1400 students; that number had grown to 2367 by 1982, 4302 by 1997, 9921 students in 2014, and 10,536 students at the end of 2016. Within the student body, 112 different nationalities are represented. In the period from 1982 to 2014 the female proportion of the student body has increased from 12% to 27%. The proportion of female students is lowest at the School of Computer Science and Communication (15%) and highest at the School of Life Sciences (49%).

=== Clubs ===
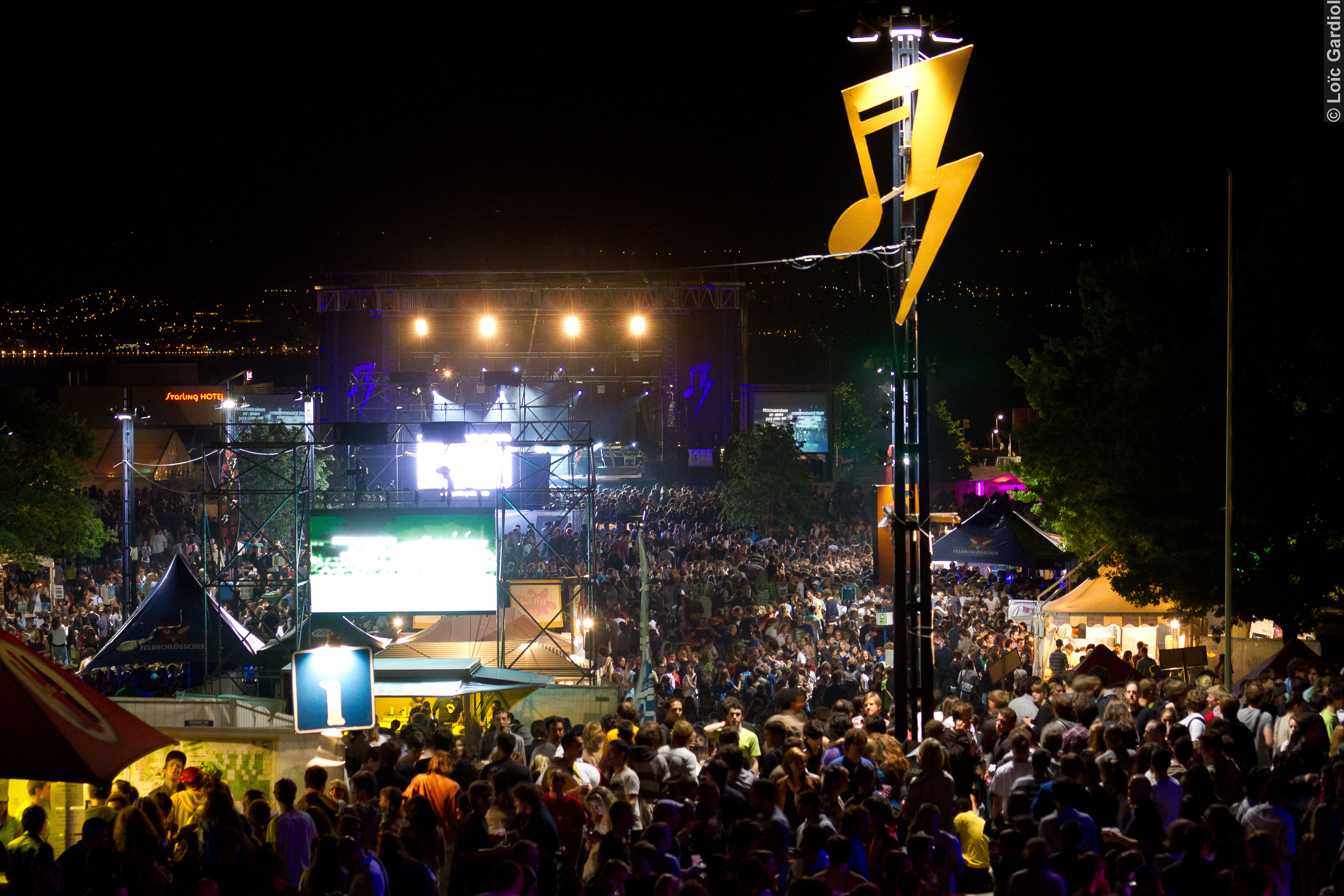
The Balelec Festival is a music festival organized annually on campus.

The school encourages the formation of associations and sports activities on campus. As of 2023, there are nearly a hundred clubs and associations on campus for recreational and social purposes. In addition, the school has its own monthly newspaper, Flash. Included in the 79 associations are

- AGEPoly is the Student's Association. Its purpose is to represent the EPFL's students, defend the general interests of the students and inform and consult its members on decisions of the EPFL Direction that concern them.
- The Forum is a student association responsible for organization of the Forum EPFL. The Forum was founded in 1982 as a platform for exchange and meeting between the academic and professional communities. Today, it is one of the largest recruiting events in Europe, and the largest in Switzerland.
- UNIPOLY is the EPFL Association for Ecology, the Association works to create awareness of ecology on campus and in western Switzerland. UNIPOLY is part of the World Student Community for Sustainable Development, an international network of student organizations for sustainable development consisting of EPFL, ETH Zurich, MIT, University of Tokyo, University of Fort Hare, University of Nairobi, Chalmers, and University of Yaounde.
- The Anime and Manga club, PolyJapan, schedules viewings of seasonal anime on a regular basis.
- Polympiads is promoting mathematics and informatics through competitions. They organise the Helvetic Coding Contest, Switzerland's biggest programming competition.
- ArtePoly is EPFL’s art club, organising events related to the arts. They publish an illustrated fanzine-style magazine twice per semester, the SuperBoom, and organise weekly sewing sessions, film projections, workshops and more.

=== Music festivals ===
Several music festivals are held yearly. The largest one is the Balélec Festival, organized in May each year since 1981. The festival welcomes 15,000 visitors to around 30 concerts.

=== Archimedean Oath ===
EPFL was the birthplace of the Archimedean Oath, proposed by students in 1990. The Archimedean Oath has since spread to a number of European engineering schools. The Archimedean Oath is an ethical code of practice for engineers and technicians, similar to the Hippocratic Oath used in the medical world.

=== Harassment and sexism ===
In 2020, the student association Polyquity published numerous testimonies from students via an Instagram account @payetonepfl denouncing cases of sexual, homophobic and racist harassment as well as cases of rape within the associations present on campus but also within the teaching staff. The student association denounces serious failings of the institution that is supposed to manage harassment.

== Scientific partners ==
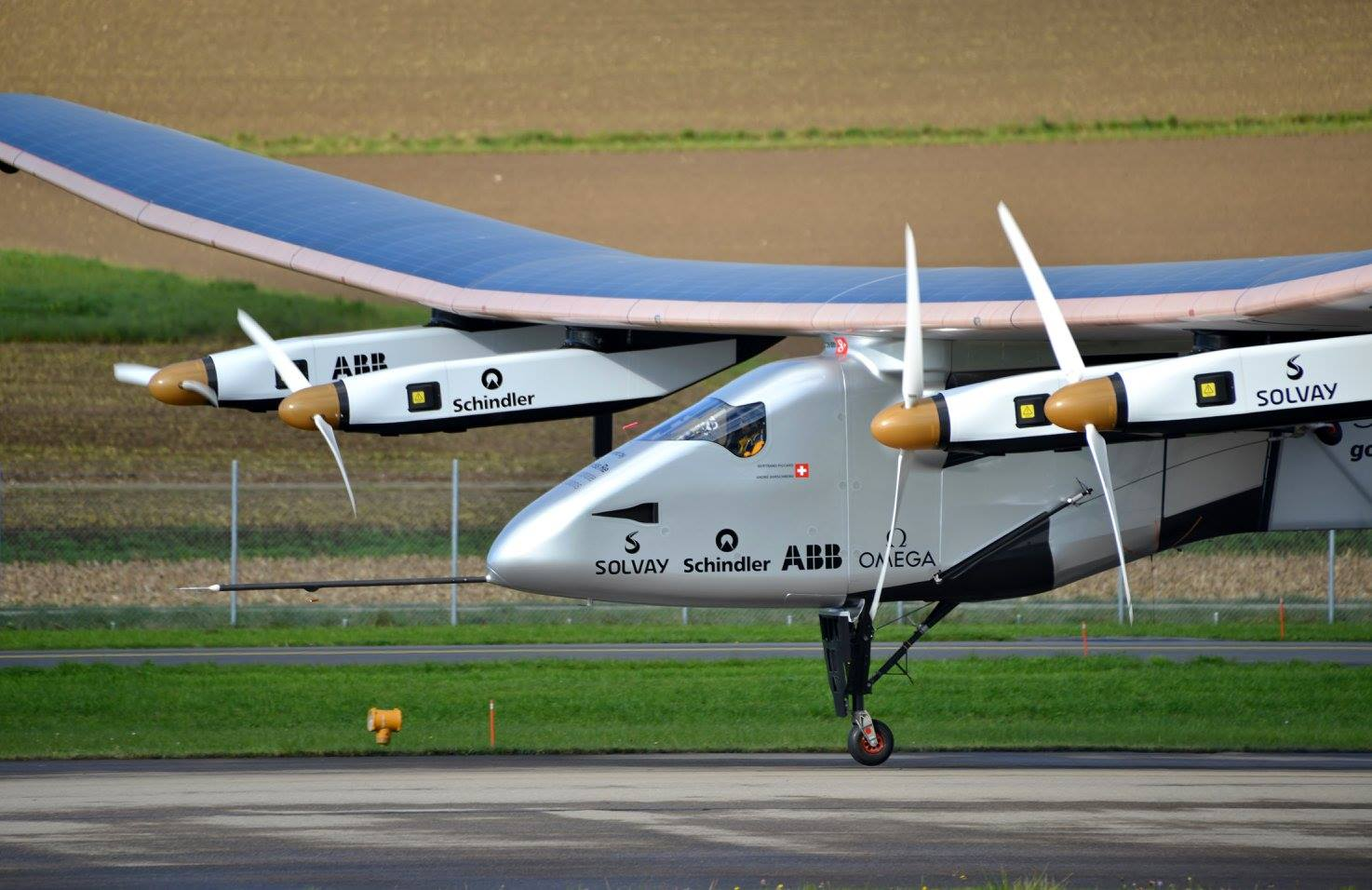
Solar Impulse 2 in 2014

- EPFL is the official scientific advisor of Alinghi, twice winners of the America's cup 2003 and 2007.
- Solar Impulse is a Swiss long-range solar powered aircraft project developed at EPFL, the project has now achieved the first circumnavigation of the world using only solar power.
- The Hydroptère, is an experimental sailing hydrofoil that in 2009 broke the world speed sailing record, sustaining a speed of 52.86 knots (97.90 km/h; 60.83 mph) for 500m in 30 knots of wind
- EPFL contributed to the construction of SwissCube-1. It is the first satellite entirely built in Switzerland. It was put into orbit on 23 September 2009 by the Indian launcher PSLV.
- To better understand the relationship between nutrition and the brain, EPFL and the Nestlé research centre has signed a five-year agreement providing 5 million CHF each year for the creation of two new chairs at the EPFL Brain Mind Institute.
- Logitech and EPFL has announced the creation of the EPFL Logitech Incubator that will provide financial, educational and operational support in entrepreneurship to researchers and students.
- Breitling Orbiter 3 became the first balloon to circumnavigate the Earth non-stop in March 1999. The balloon was piloted by Bertrand Piccard and Brian Jones.
- Solar Impulse 2 completed the first circumnavigation of the Earth by a piloted fixed-wing aircraft using only solar power. The plane was piloted (alternatively) by André Borschberg and Bertrand Piccard.
- The Human Brain Project is the successor of the EPFL Blue Brain Project. The project is directed by EPFL and involves 86 institutions across Europe. The total cost is estimated at 1.190 billion euros.
- EPFL has hosted the UNESCO Chair in Technologies for Development since 2007, where notable papers are presented by experts in the field. In 2014, Mobile Financial Services in Disaster Relief: Modeling Sustainability was presented by technology analyst, David Garrity.

== Schools and colleges ==
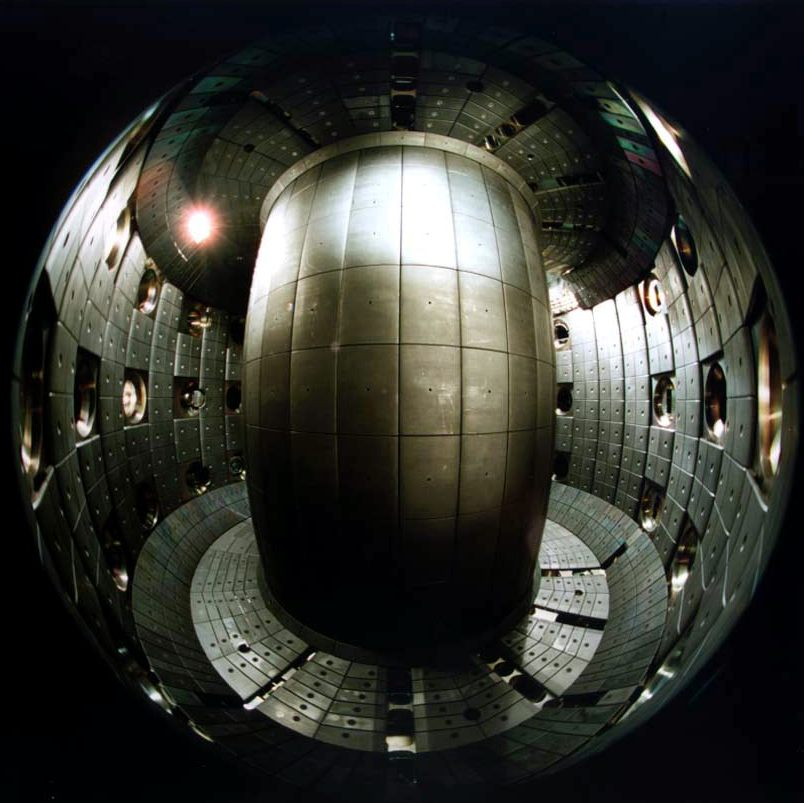
The Tokamak (TCV): inner view, with the graphite-clad torus. Courtesy of SPC-EPFL

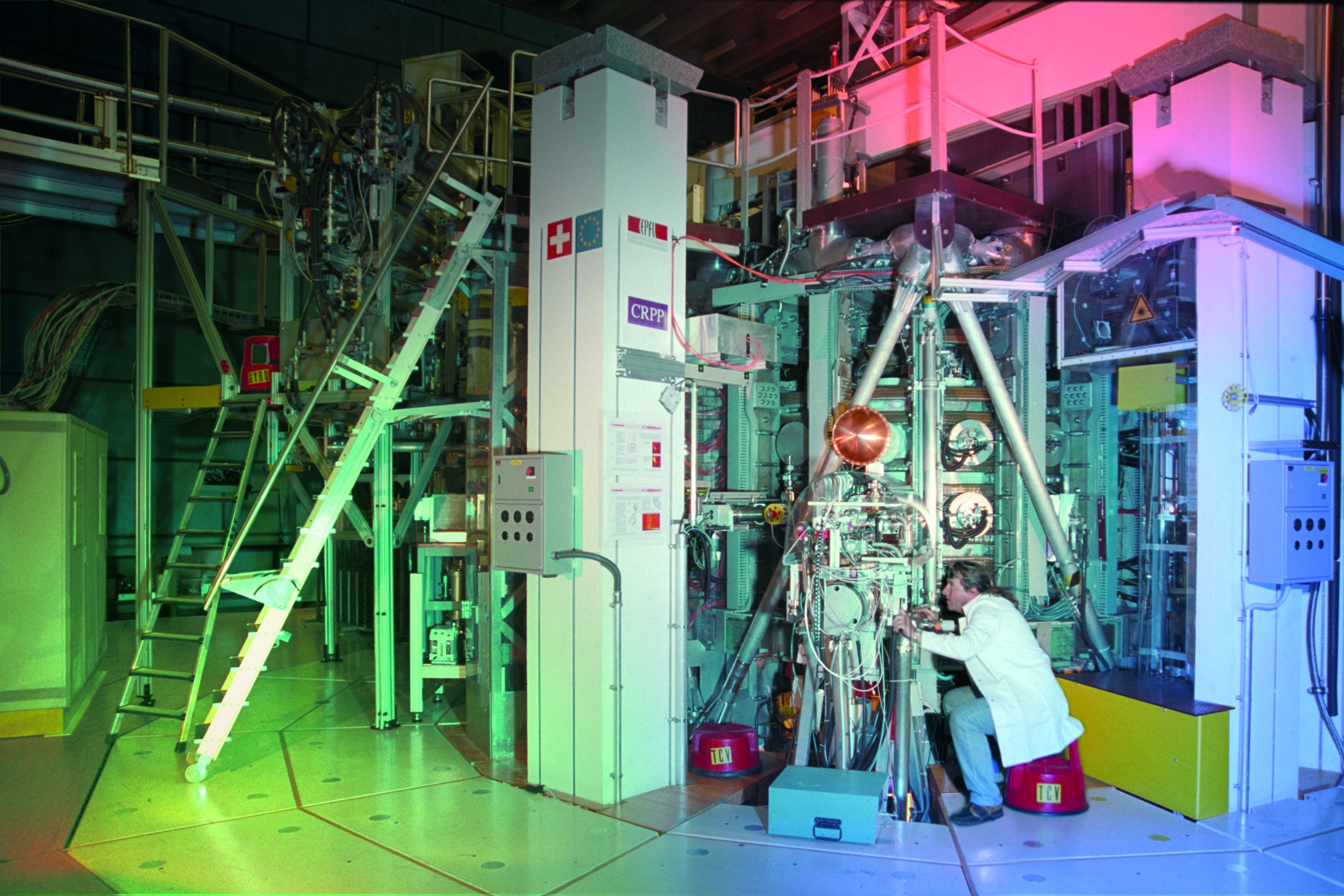
Outside view of the Tokamak at the EPFL

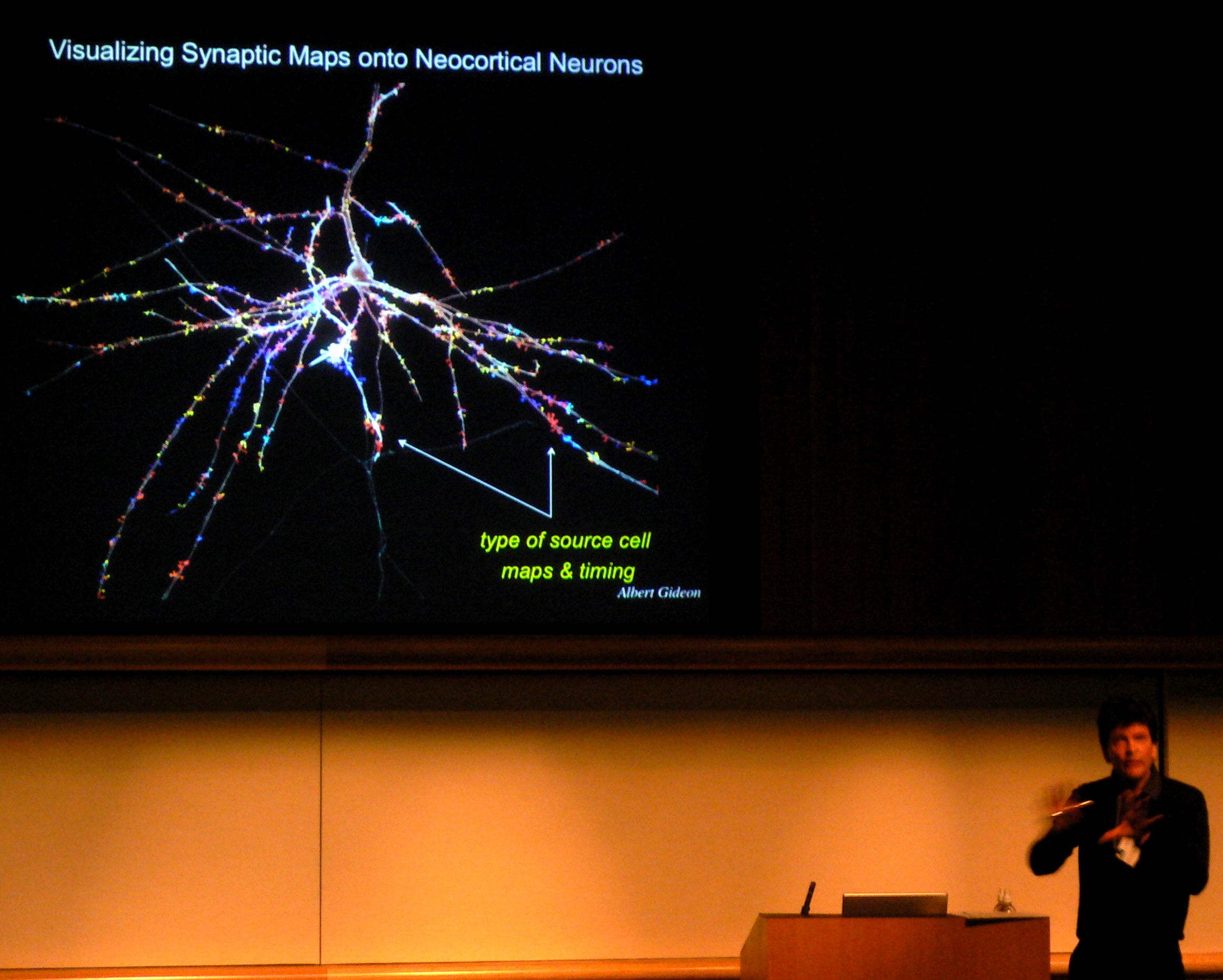
Henry Markram, the coordinator of the Human Brain Project

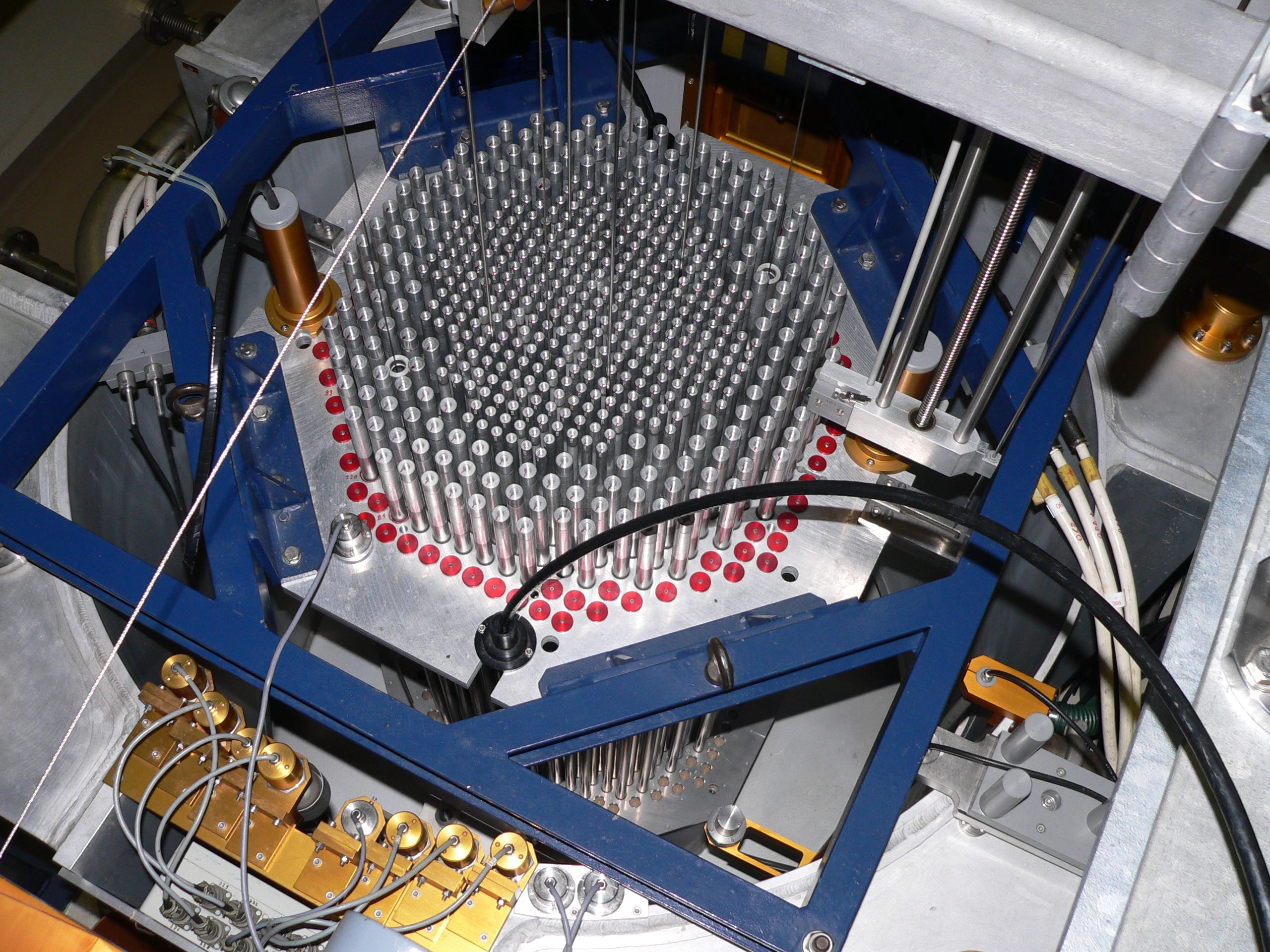
CROCUS, the only nuclear reactor of the French-speaking part of Switzerland

EPFL is organised into eight schools and colleges, themselves formed of institutes that group research units (laboratories or chairs) around common themes:

- School of Basic Sciences (SB, Paul Joseph Dyson)
  - Institute of Mathematics (MATH, Maryna Viazovska)
  - Institute of Chemical Sciences and Engineering (ISIC, Kevin Sivula)
  - Institute of Physics (IPHYS, Harald Brune)
  - European Centre of Atomic and Molecular Computations (CECAM, Ignacio Pagonabarraga Mora)
  - Bernoulli Center (CIB, Martin Hairer)
  - Biomedical Imaging Research Center (CIBM, Rolf Gruetter)
  - Interdisciplinary Center for Electron Microscopy (CIME, Cécile Hébert)
  - Max Planck-EPFL Centre for Molecular Nanosciences and Technology (CMNT, Thomas Rizzo)
  - Swiss Plasma Center (SPC, Paolo Ricci)
  - Laboratory of Astrophysics (LASTRO, Jean-Paul Kneib)
- School of Engineering (STI, Adrian Mihai Ionescu)
  - Institute of Electrical Engineering (IEL, Giovanni De Micheli)
  - Institute of Mechanical Engineering (IGM, Thomas Gmür)
  - Institute of Materials (IMX, Michaud Véronique)
  - Institute of Microengineering (IMT, Olivier Martin)
  - Institute of Bioengineering (IBI, Matthias Lütolf)
  - Center for Quantum Science and Engineering (QSE Center, Interdisciplinary between STI, SB, and IC)
- School of Architecture, Civil and Environmental Engineering (ENAC, Katrin Beyer)
  - Institute of Architecture
  - Civil Engineering Institute
  - Environmental Engineering Institute
- School of Computer and Communication Sciences (IC, Rüdiger Urbanke)
  - Algorithms & Theoretical Computer Science
  - Artificial Intelligence & Machine Learning
  - Computational Biology
  - Computer Architecture & Integrated Systems
  - Data Management & Information Retrieval
  - Graphics & Vision
  - Human-Computer Interaction
  - Information & Communication Theory
  - Networking
  - Programming Languages & Formal Methods
  - Security & Cryptography
  - Signal & Image Processing
  - Systems
- School of Life Sciences (SV, Andrew Oates)
  - Bachelor-Master Teaching Section in Life Sciences and Technologies (SSV)
  - Brain Mind Institute (BMI, Carmen Sandi)
  - Institute of Bioengineering (IBI, Melody Swartz)
  - Swiss Institute for Experimental Cancer Research (ISREC, Douglas Hanahan)
  - Global Health Institute (GHI, Bruno Lemaitre)
  - Ten Technology Platforms & Core Facilities (PTECH)
  - Center for Phenogenomics (CPG)
  - NCCR Synaptic Bases of Mental Diseases (NCCR-SYNAPSY)
- College of Management of Technology (CDM, Rüdiger Fahlenbrach)
  - Management of Technology and Entrepreneurship Institute (MTEI, Daniel Kuhn)
  - Swiss Finance Institute at EPFL (SFI@EPFL, Erwan Morellec)
  - Enterprise for Society Center (E4S, Michaël Aklin)
  - Executive Education (Andrea Dunbar, Marc Gruber)
- College of Humanities (CDH, Thomas David)
  - Human and social sciences teaching program (CDH-SHS, Thomas David)

In addition to the eight schools there are seven closely related institutions:

- Swiss Cancer Centre
- Center for Biomedical Imaging (CIBM)
- Centre for Advanced Modelling Science (CADMOS)
- École cantonale d'art de Lausanne (ECAL)
- Campus Biotech
- Wyss Center for Bio- and Neuro-engineering
- Swiss National Supercomputing Centre

== Notable people ==
=== Presidents ===
The school had directors from 1853 to 1969. In 1969, the school was separated from the rest of the University of Lausanne and became a federal institute. The presidents are:

- Maurice Cosandey (1969–1978)
- Bernard Vittoz (1978–1992)
- Jean-Claude Badoux (1992–2000)
- Patrick Aebischer (2000–2016)
- Martin Vetterli (2017–2025)
- Anna Fontcuberta i Morral (2025–)

=== Professors ===
- Adrian Mihai Ionescu (Professor, Micro/Nano-electronics, Nanoelectronic Devices Laboratory)
- Álvaro Siza Vieira, Portuguese architect, (Guest Professor, Architecture), Pritzker Prize 1992
- Amin Shokrollahi (Professor, Computer Science and Communication Systems and Mathematics. Best known for the invention of Raptor codes)
- Anastasia Ailamaki (Professor, database systems and applications)
- Anders Meibom (Professor, environmental bio-geochemistry)
- Andrea Ablasser (Assistant Professor, immunology)
- Andrew Oates (Professor, biological timing, patterning, oscillators, synchronisation)
- Arjen Lenstra (Professor, cryptographic algorithms)
- Babak Falsafi (Professor, computer architecture and digital platform design)
- Bart Deplancke (Professor, biology and genetics)
- Bernard Moret (Professor emeritus, computational phylogenetics)
- Boi Faltings (Professor, artificial intelligence)
- Beat Fierz (Professor, chemical biology)
- Carmela Troncoso (Professor, security and privacy engineering)
- Claude Nicollier (Professor, spatial technology and astronaut)
- Dario Floreano (Professor, intelligent systems)
- David Chipperfield, British architect, (Visiting Professor, Architecture)
- Denis Duboule (Professor, Life Sciences)
- Roger Boltshauser, Swiss architect, (Visiting Professor, architecture)
- Edouard Bugnion (Swiss software architect and businessman, VMware cofounder)
- Edoardo Charbon (Professor, electrical engineering)
- Eduardo Souto de Moura, Portuguese architect, (Visiting Professor, Architecture), Pritzker Prize 2011
- Francesco Mondada (Professor, mobile robotics)
- Friedhelm Hummel (Professor, neuroengineering)
- Georges Meylan (Professor, astrophysics and cosmology)
- Giovanni De Micheli (Professor, integrated systems)
- Gisou van der Goot (Professor, cell biology)
- Henry Markram (Professor, neurology, director of the Human Brain Project)
- Hubert Girault (Professor, physical and analytical electrochemistry)
- Jean-Daniel Nicoud (Professor, Computer science, inventor of the modern ball mouse)
- Jacques-Edouard Moser (Professor, physical chemistry)
- Jacques Lévy (Professor, geography and urbanism at the School of Architecture, Civil and Environmental Engineering)
- János Pach (Professor Emeritus, Mathematics, One of the few living Mathematicians with Erdős number 1)
- Jean-François Molinari (Professor, computational solid mechanics)
- Jean-Luc Sandoz (Professor, civil engineer, timber specialist, inventor of Sylvatest and Polux)
- Jean-Pierre Hubaux (Professor, security and privacy)
- Joseph Sifakis (Professor, Computer science, Turing Award laureate)
- Karen Scrivener (Professor of Material Sciences, founder of Nanocem and inventor of LC3)
- Luigi Snozzi
- Lyesse Laloui (Professor and director of Laboratory of Soil Mechanics)
- Martin Odersky (Professor, programming methods, inventor of Scala)
- Martin Hairer (Professor of Mathematics, developed the theory of regularity structures, awarded a Fields Medal in 2014)
- Martin Vetterli (Professor in the School of Computer and Communication Sciences EPFL)
- Maryna Viazovska (Professor, Mathematician, solved the Sphere packing problem in dimension 8 and 24, awarded a Fields Medal in 2022)
- Mathias Payer (Professor, software and system security)
- Michael Grätzel (Professor, Photonics and Interfaces Sciences, Inventor of the dye-sensitized solar cells)
- Minh Quang Tran (Professor, physics of energy and particles)
- Murat Kunt (Professor Emeritus, former Director of the Signal Processing Laboratory)
- Nicolas Grandjean (Professor, physics)
- Nicolas Thomä (Professor, structural biology and biochemistry)
- Pascal Vitali Fua (Professor, computer vision)
- Patrick Thiran (Professor, network and systems theory)
- Daniel Thalmann (Professor, Computer Science and Communication Systems, Pioneer in Virtual Humans)
- Philippe Thalmann (Professor, environmental and urban economics)
- Raphael Zuber, Swiss architect, (Visiting Professor, architecture)
- Reymond Clavel (Professor, robotics and micro engineering, inventor of the Delta robot)
- Rüdiger Urbanke (Professor, coding, communications, information theory, graphical models, statistical physics for communications and computing)
- Sabine Süsstrunk (Professor, images and visual representation), president of the Swiss Science Council
- Serge Vaudenay (Professor, security and cryptography)
- Victor Panaretos (Professor, mathematical statistics)
- Zhu Jieping (Professor, organic chemistry)
- Wilfried Kurz (Professor Emeritus, materials science and engineering)

=== Alumni ===
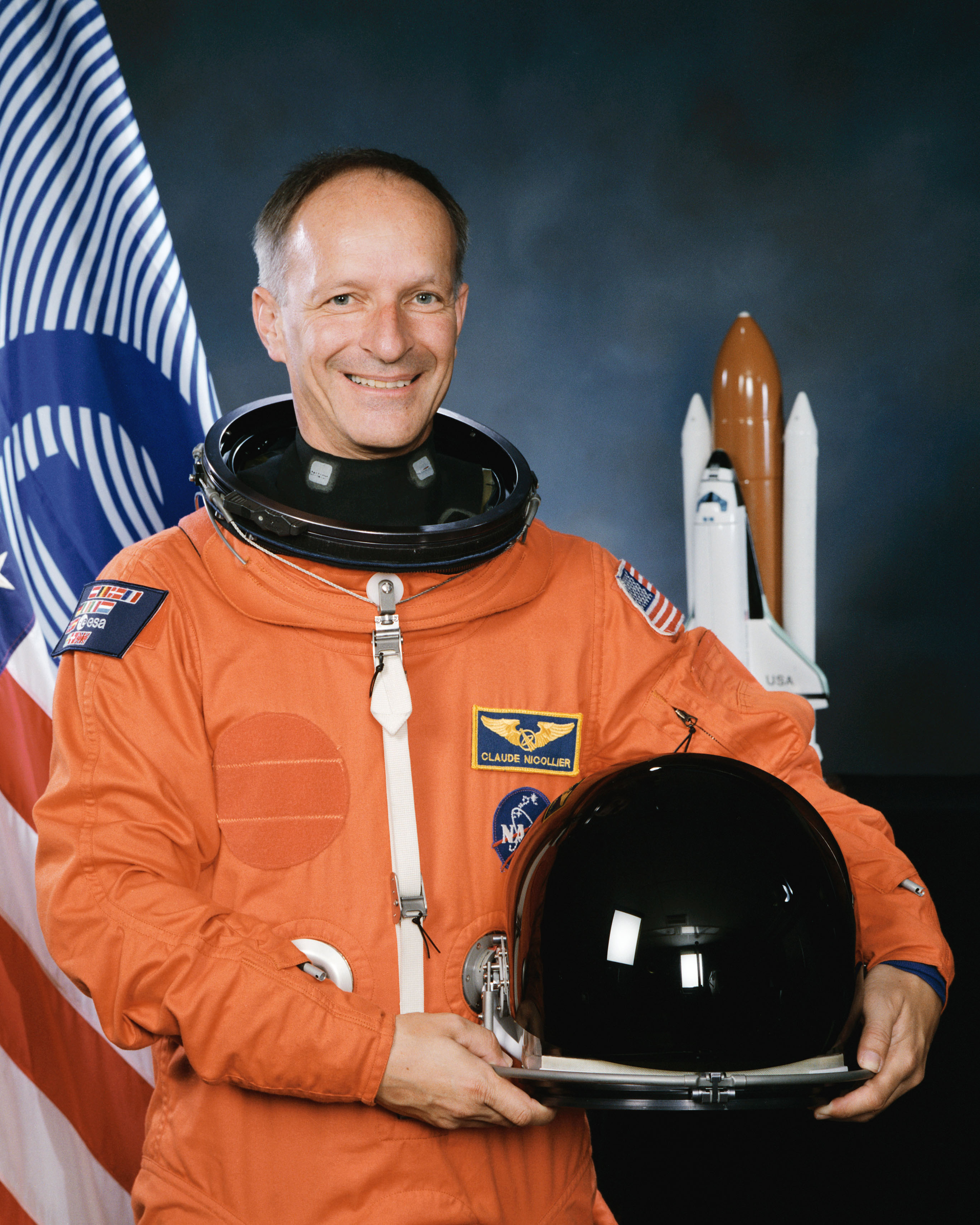
Astronaut Claude Nicollier, mission specialist representing the European Space Agency

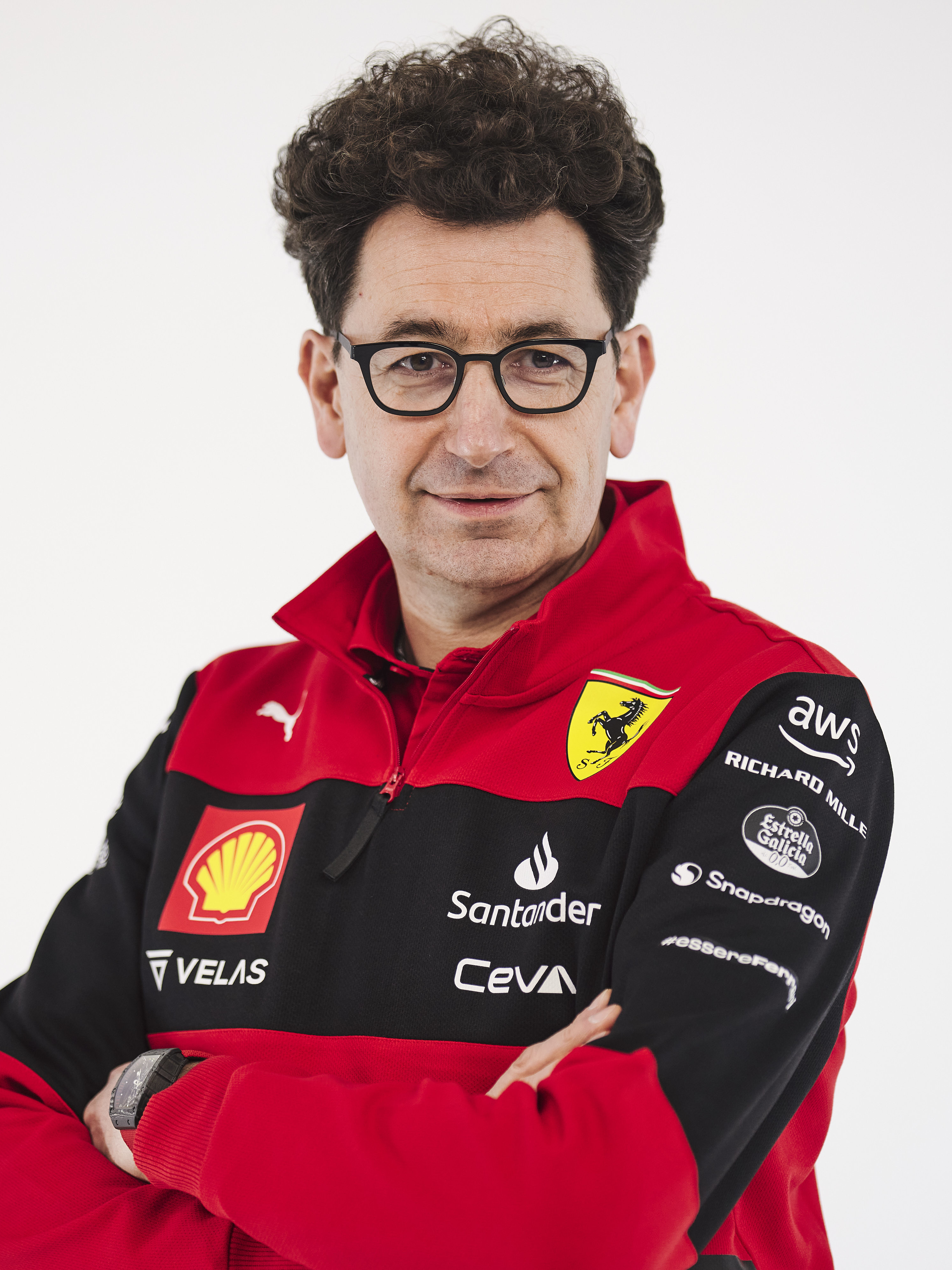
Formula One engineer and executive Mattia Binotto

- Guy Berruyer (chief executive of Sage Group)
- Mattia Binotto (team principal of Audi F1 Team and former team principal of Scuderia Ferrari)
- Aart de Geus (chairman, founder and CEO of Synopsys)
- George de Mestral (electrical engineer, inventor of Velcro)
- Eric Favre (inventor of Nespresso, the first single-serve coffee container)
- André Gorz (Austrian-French philosopher and economist)
- Daniel Borel (co-founder of Logitech)
- Franck Riboud (CEO of Danone)
- André Kudelski (CEO of Kudelski)
- Jean-Daniel Nicoud (Swiss computer scientist)
- Othman Benjelloun (Moroccan businessman)
- Daniel Brélaz (Swiss Mathematician, Politician and Environmentalist)
- Stefan Kudelski (Industrialist, inventor of the Nagra)
- Luc Recordon (Swiss politician)
- André Borschberg (businessman and pilot, founder of the Solar Impulse project)
- Jacques Dubochet (laureate of the 2017 Nobel Prize in Chemistry)
- Guillaume Pousaz (founder of Checkout.com)
- Alexandra Ros (German analytical chemist)
- Lucid Fall (South Korean singer-songwriter)

== Gallery ==
=== Buildings and campus ===
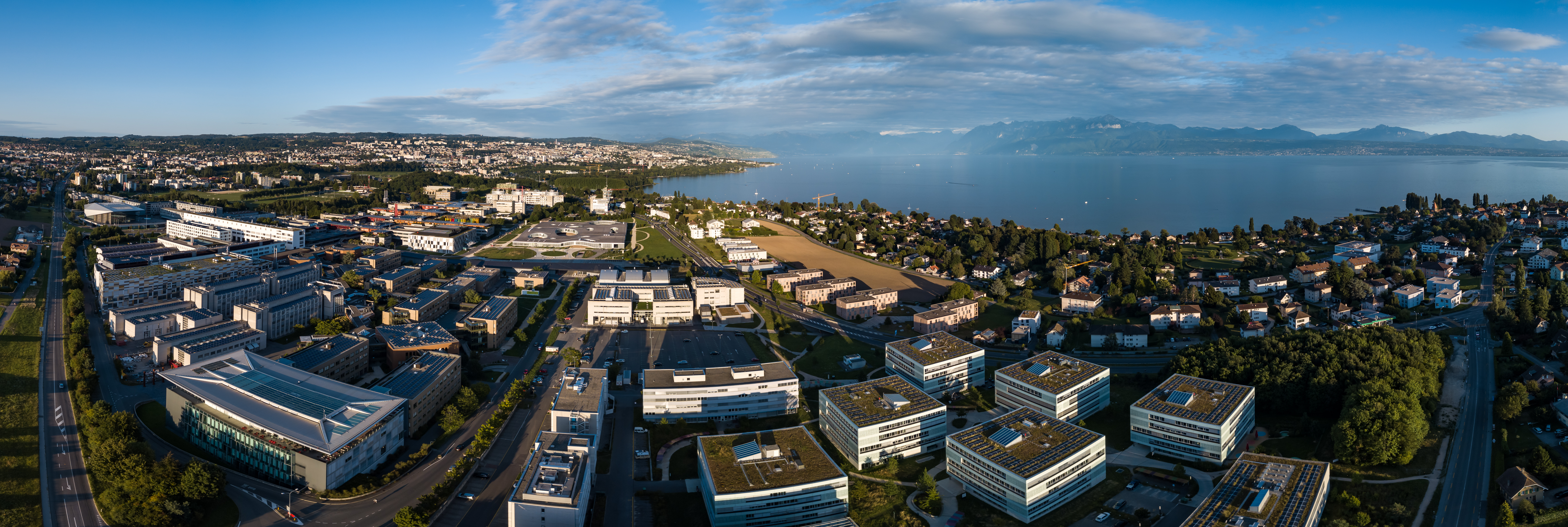
An aerial view of campus

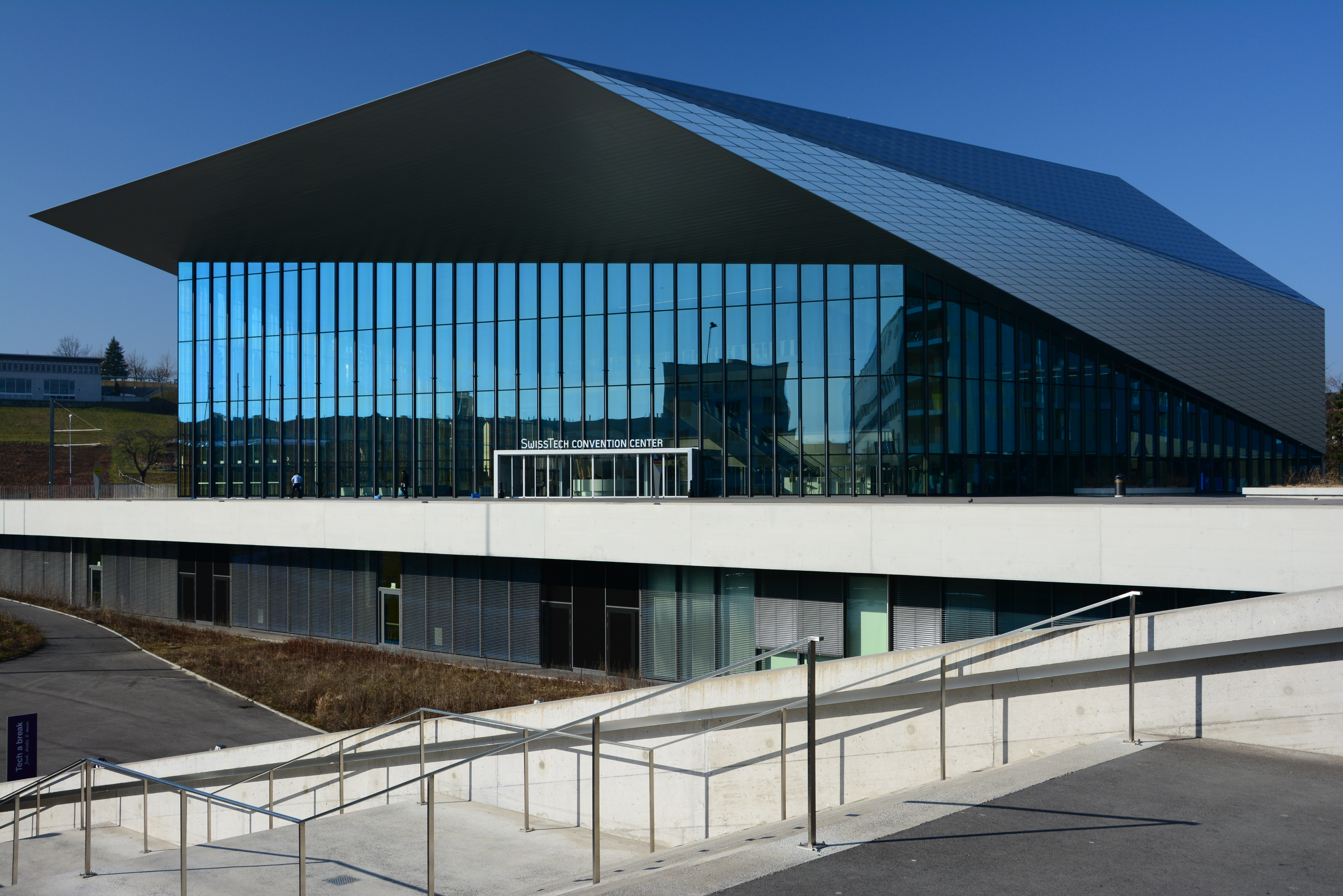
Swiss Tech Convention Center

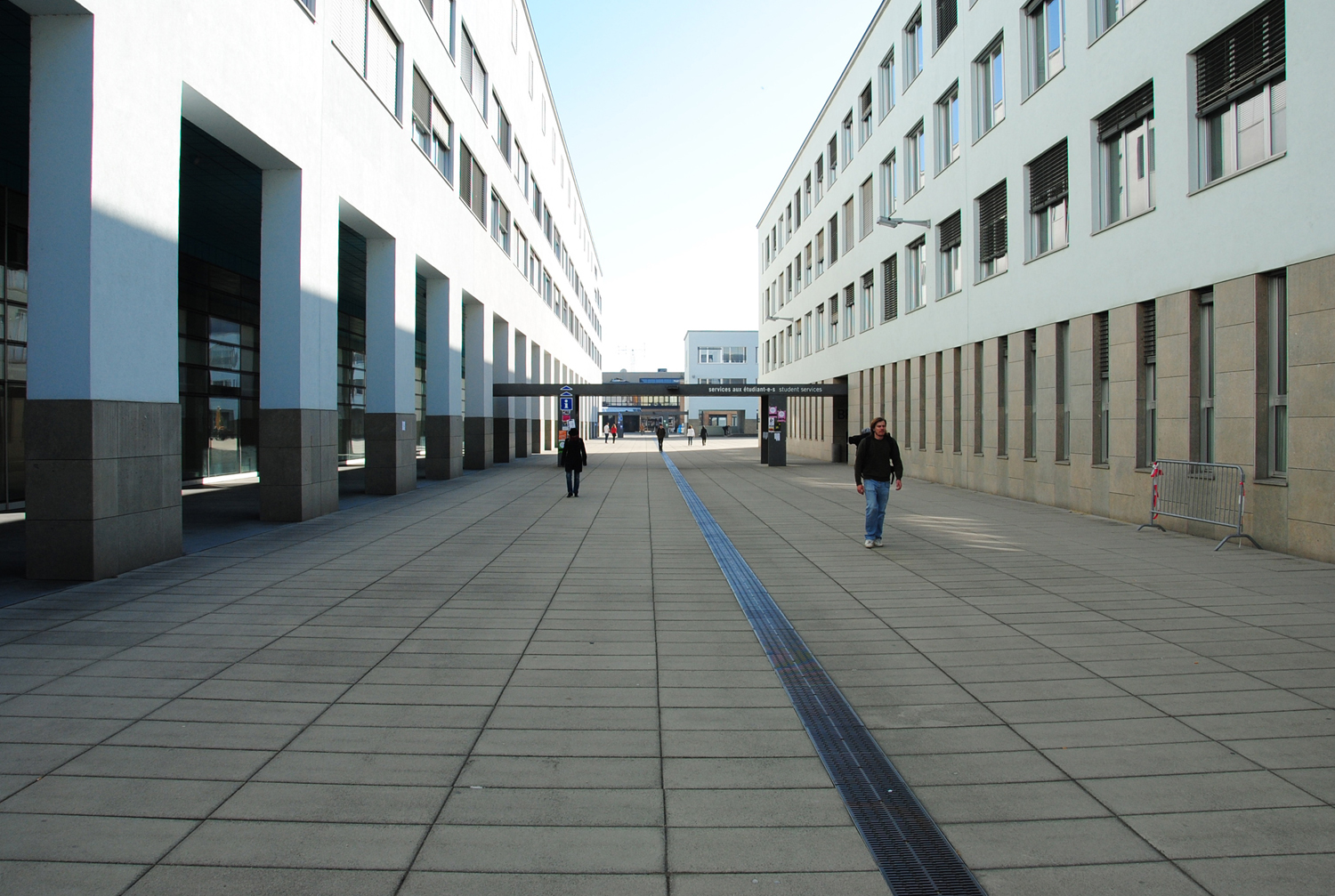
The BM and BP buildings

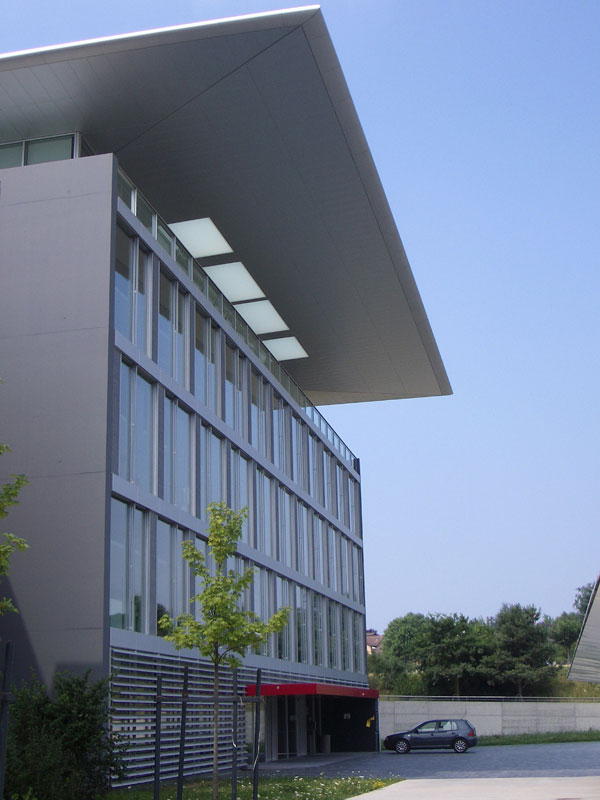
The BC building

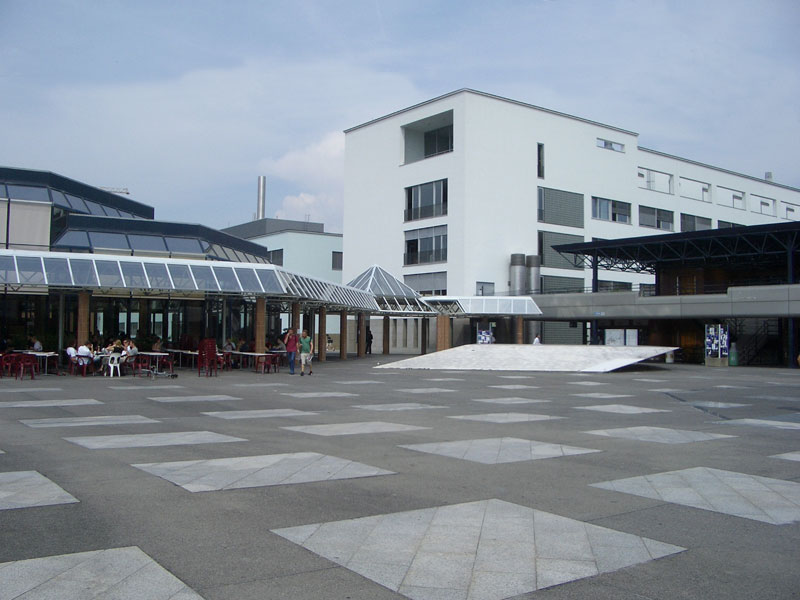
The Esplanade

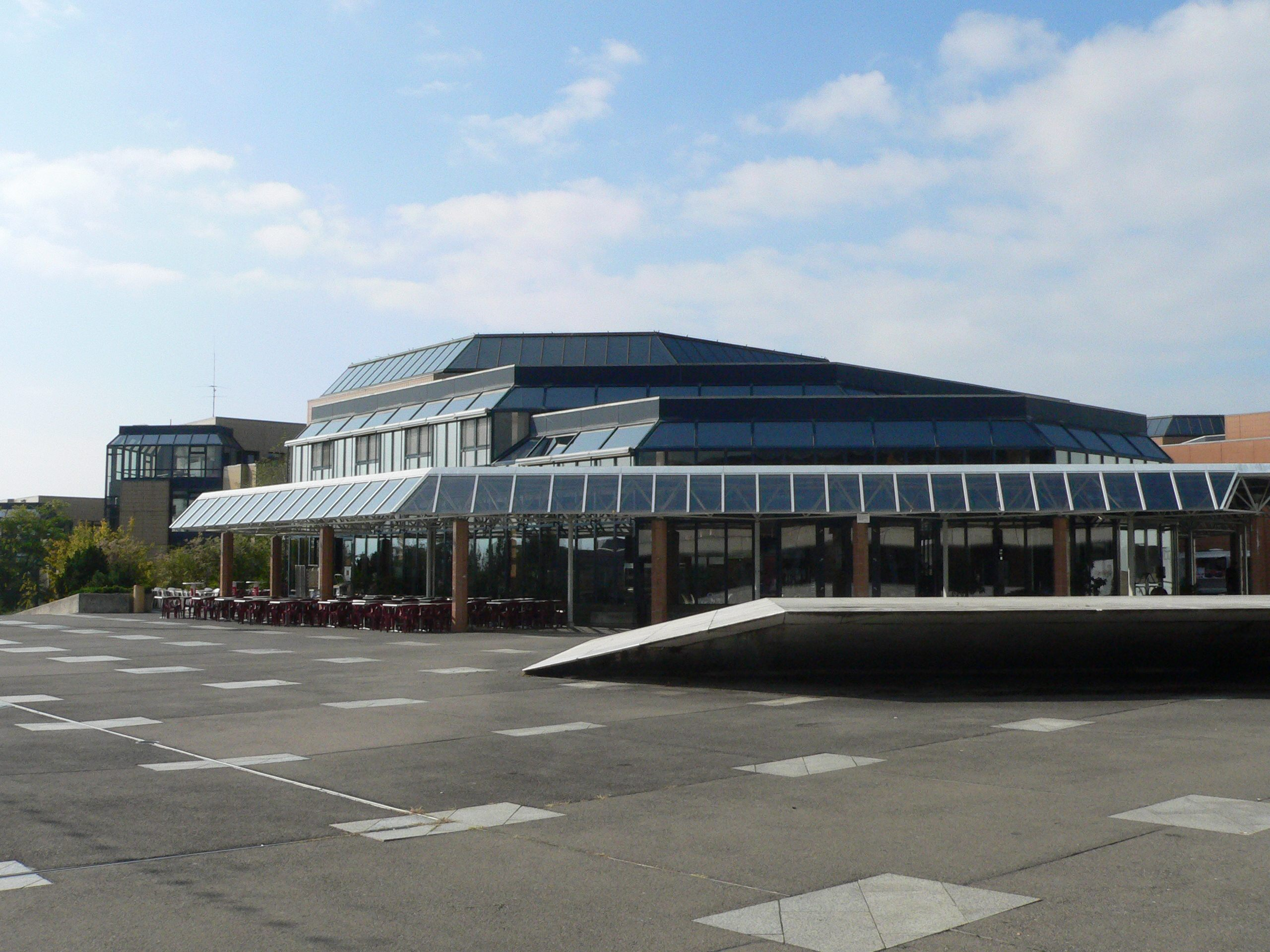
The CO building

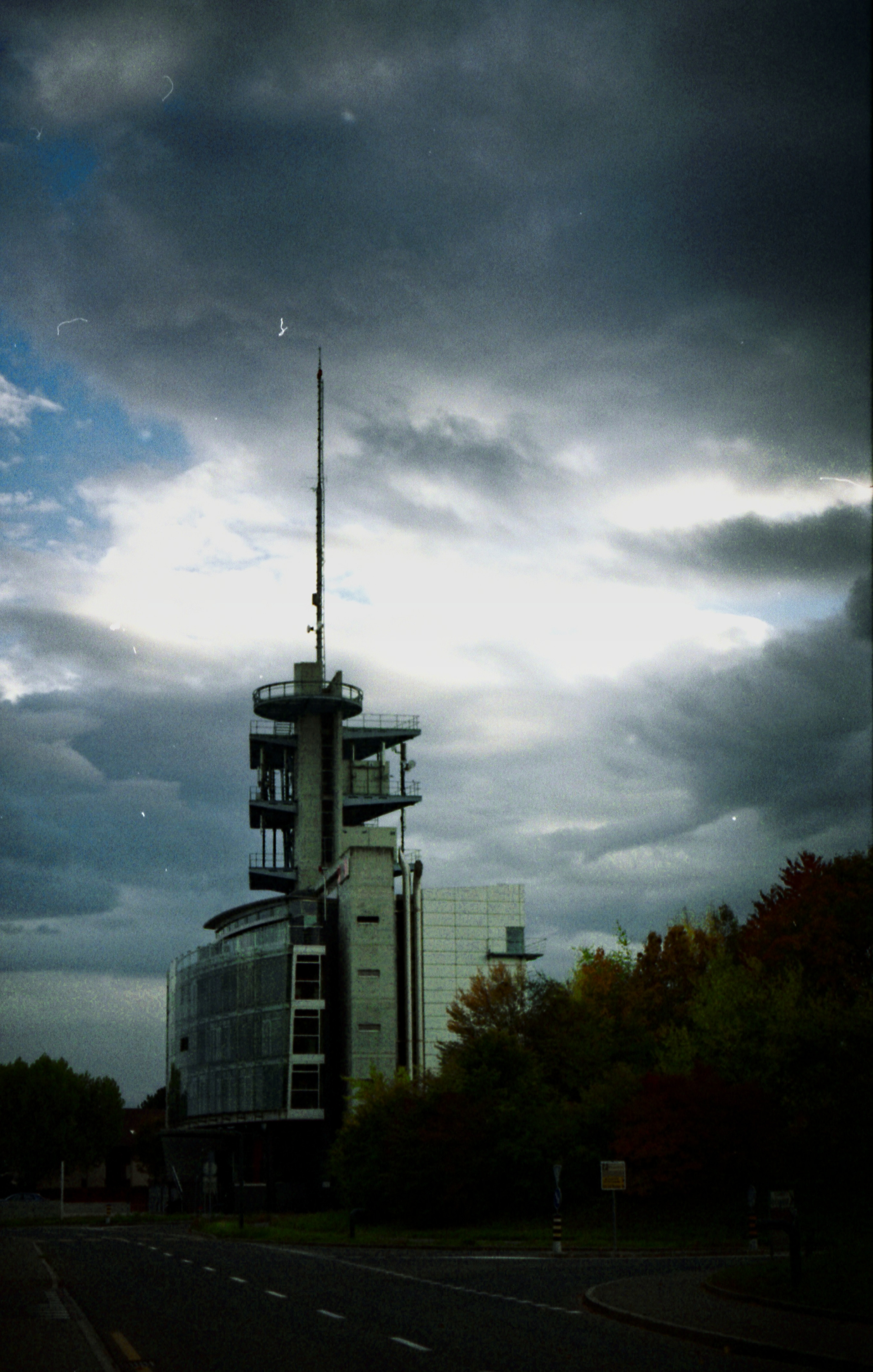
The Odyssea building

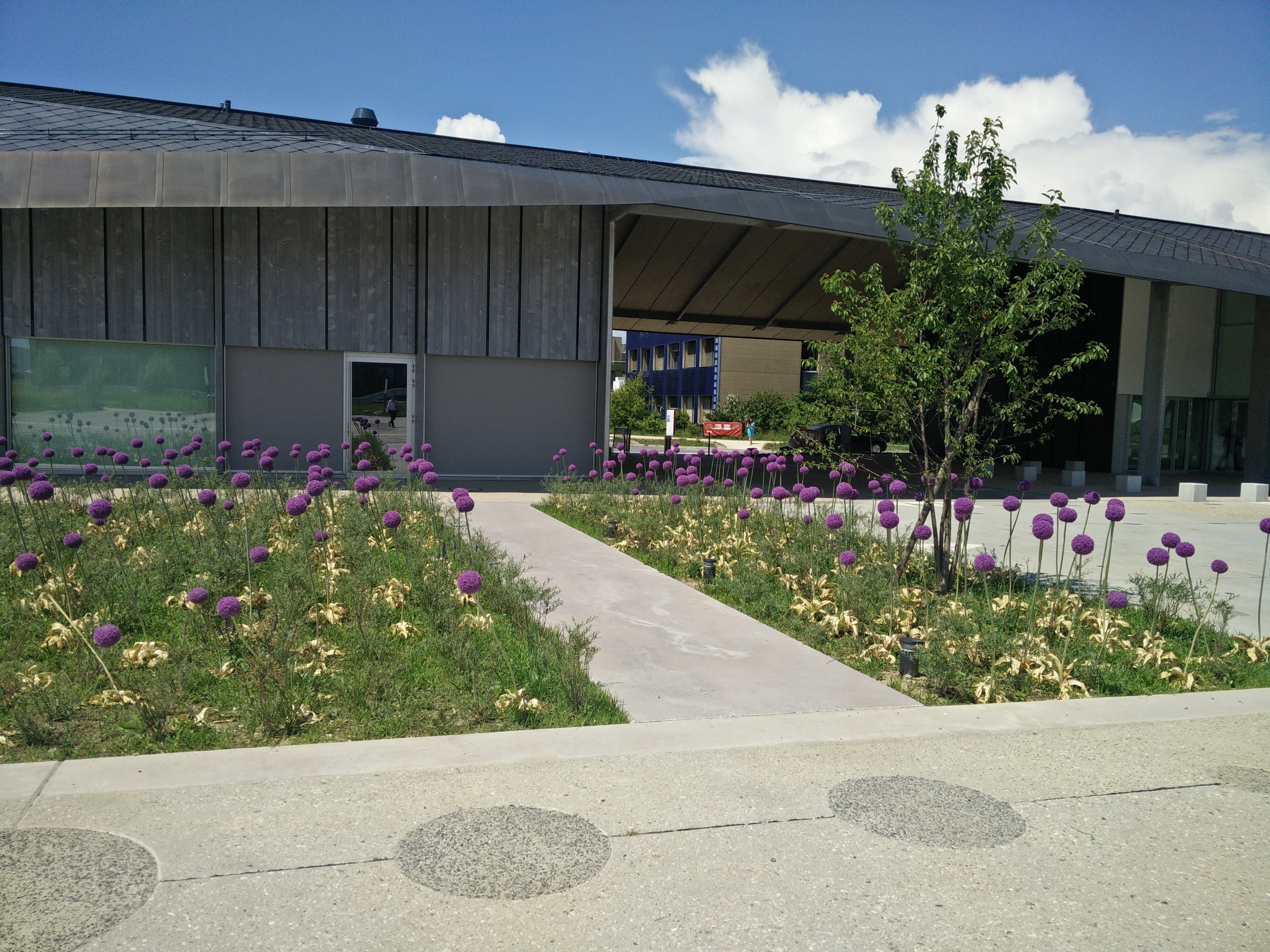
EPFL Pavilions

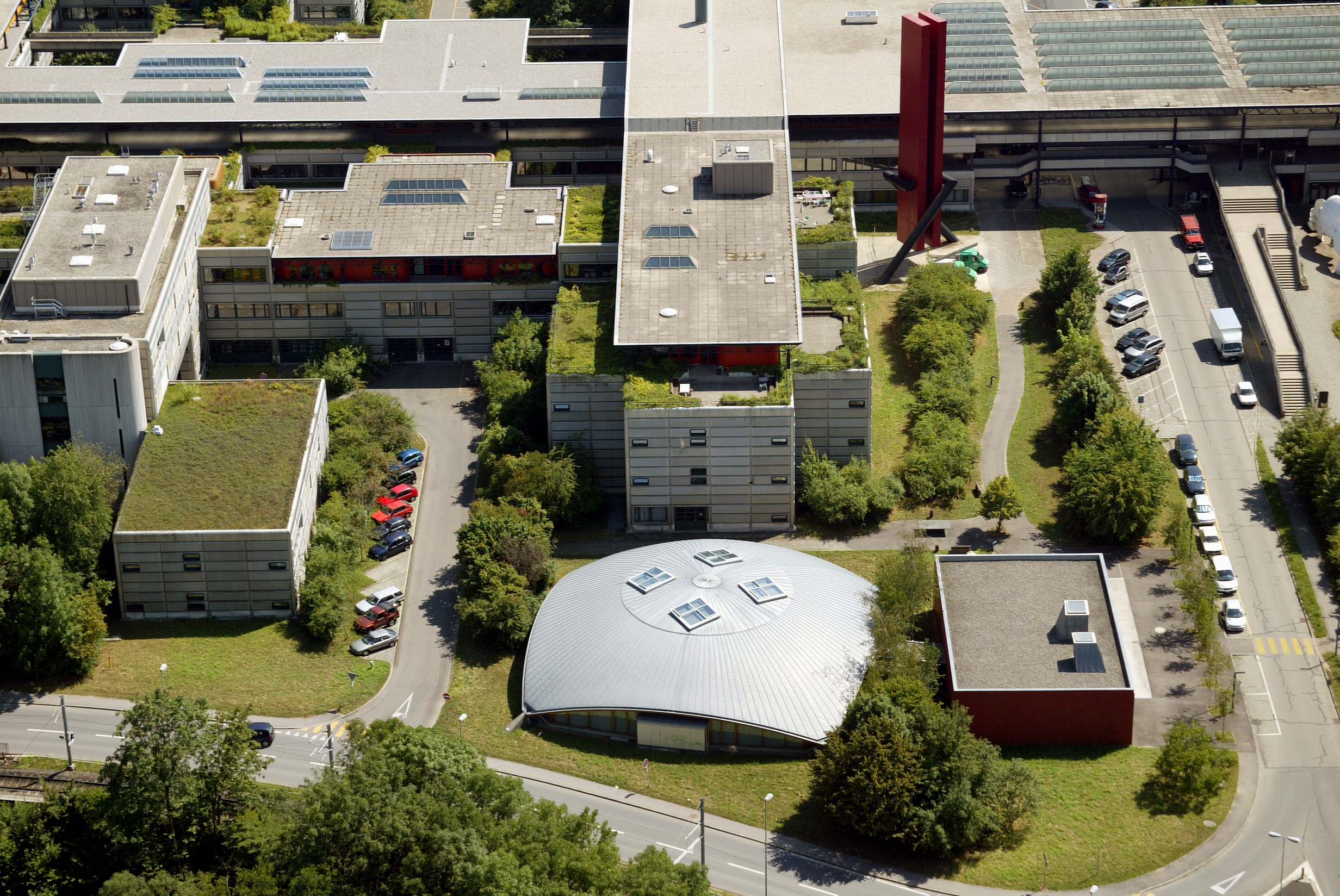
The Polydôme

=== Projects and partnerships ===
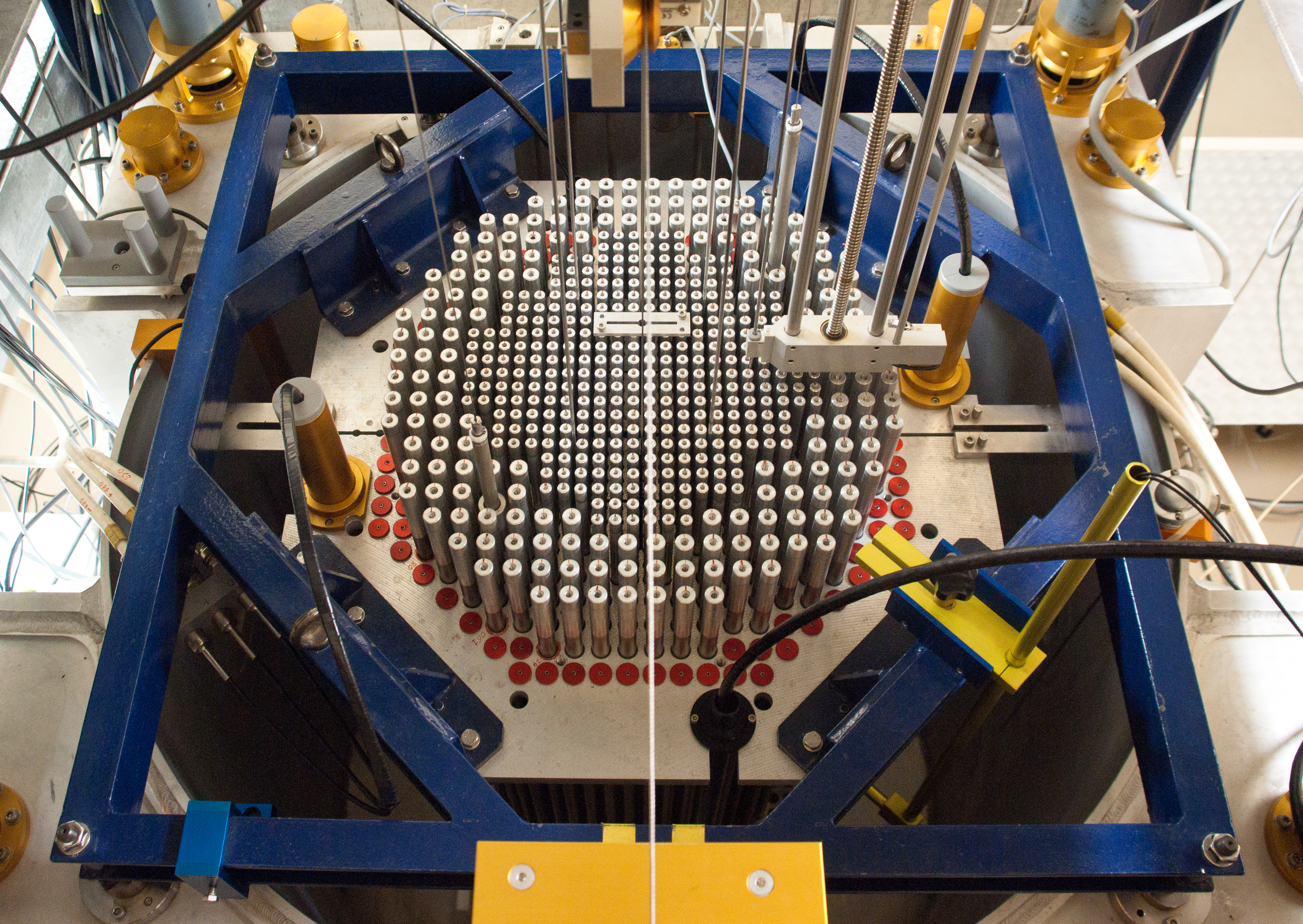
The CROCUS research reactor

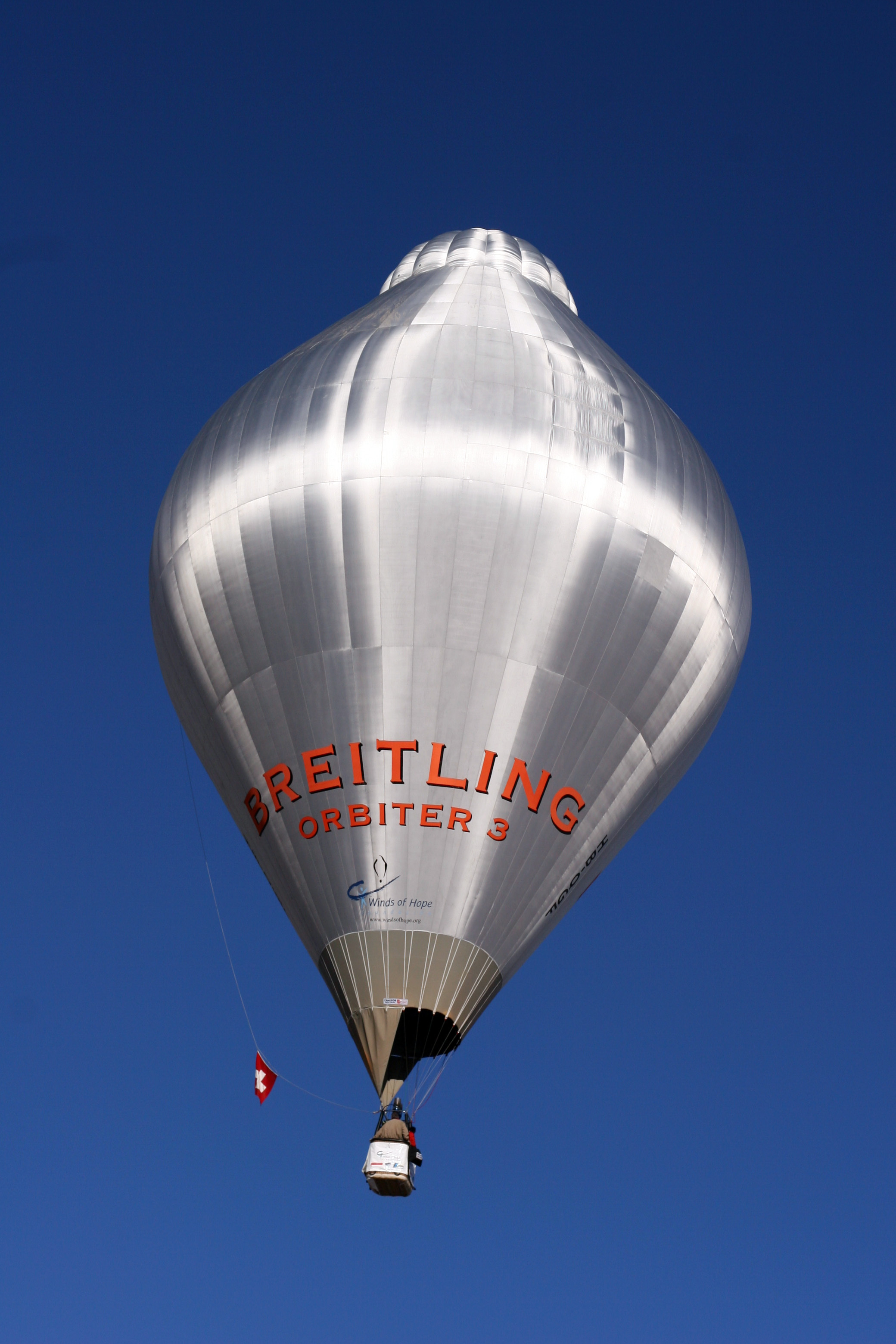
Breitling Orbiter 3 achieved the first non-stop balloon circumnavigation.

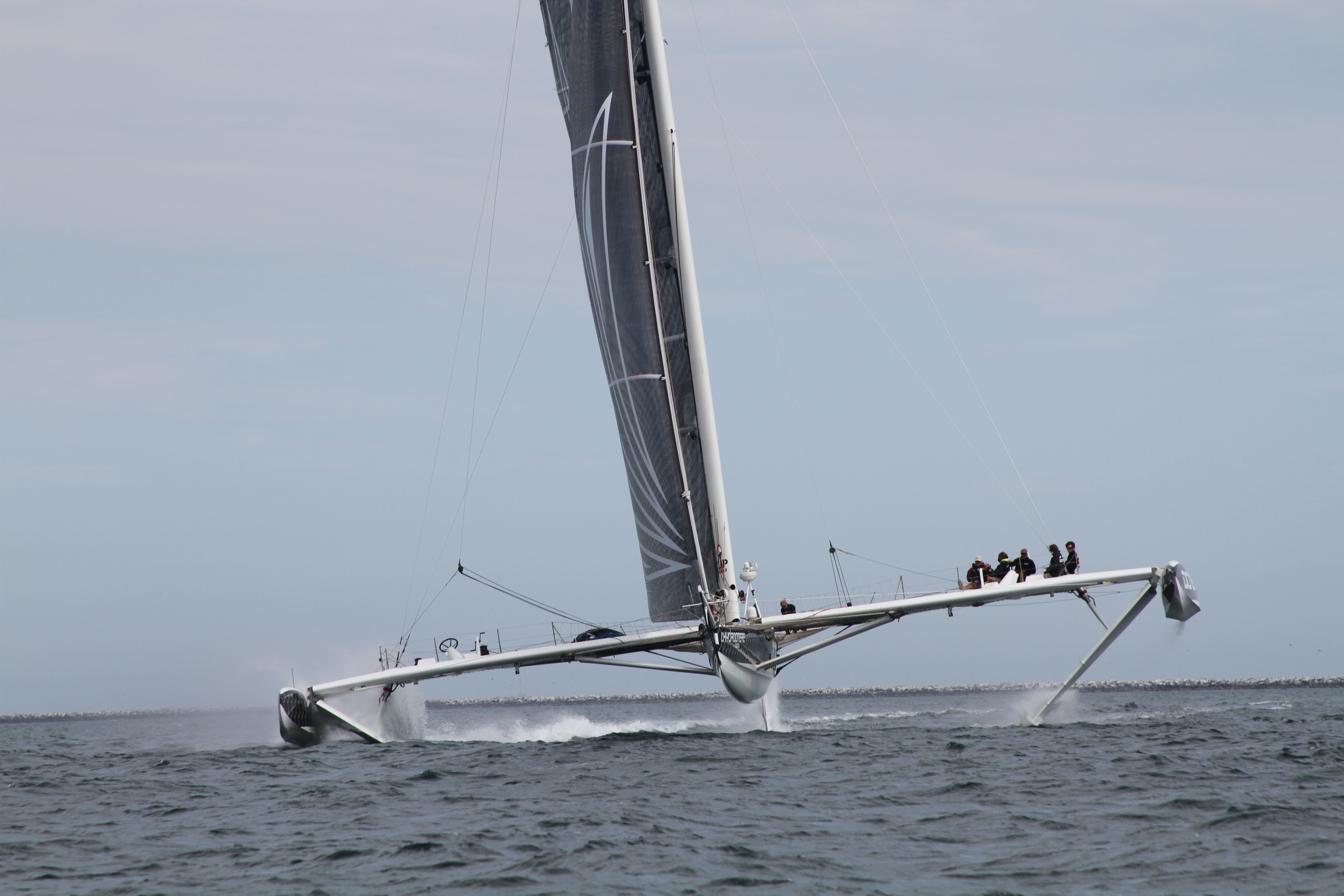
The Hydroptère

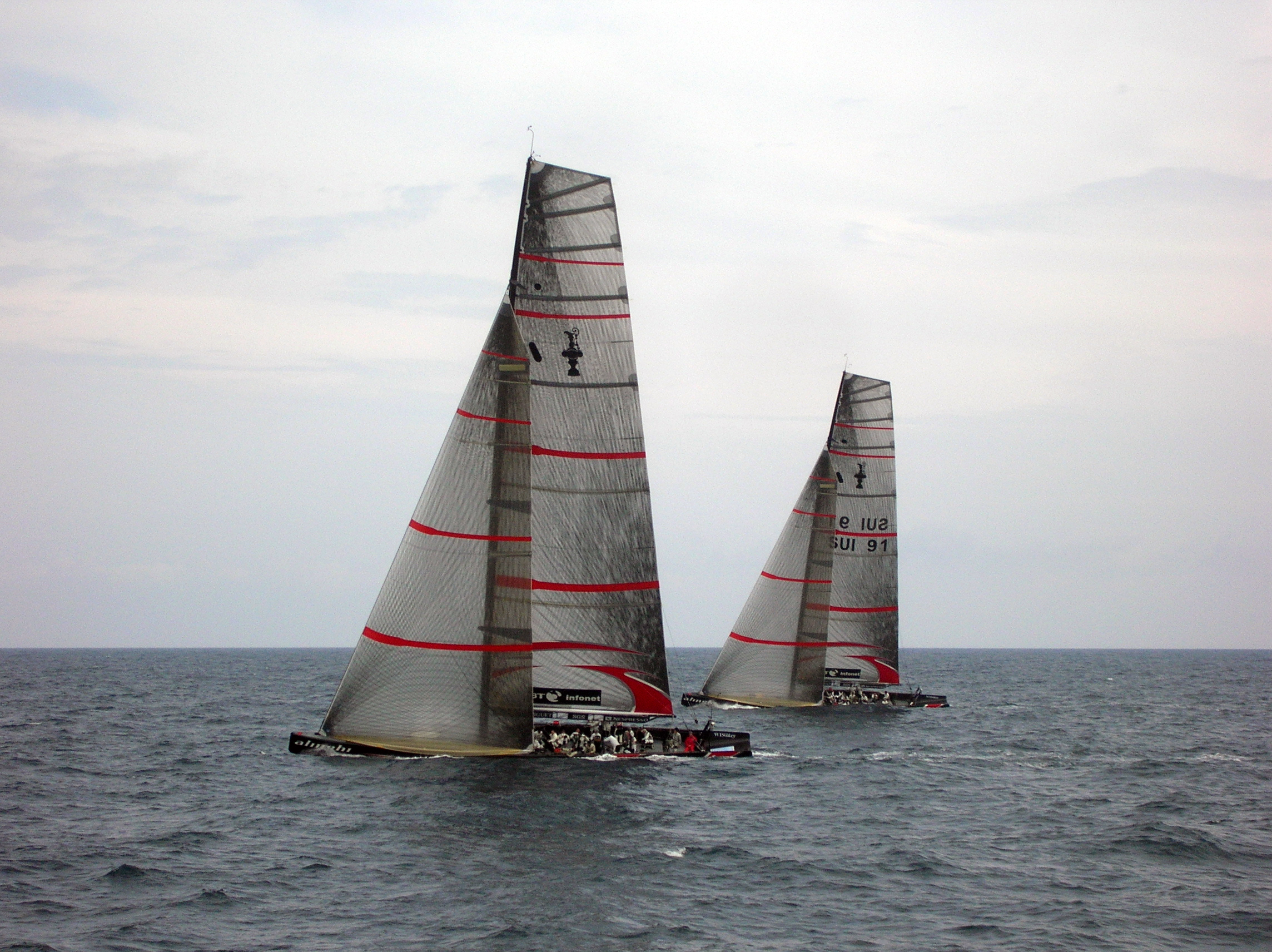
Boats of Alinghi

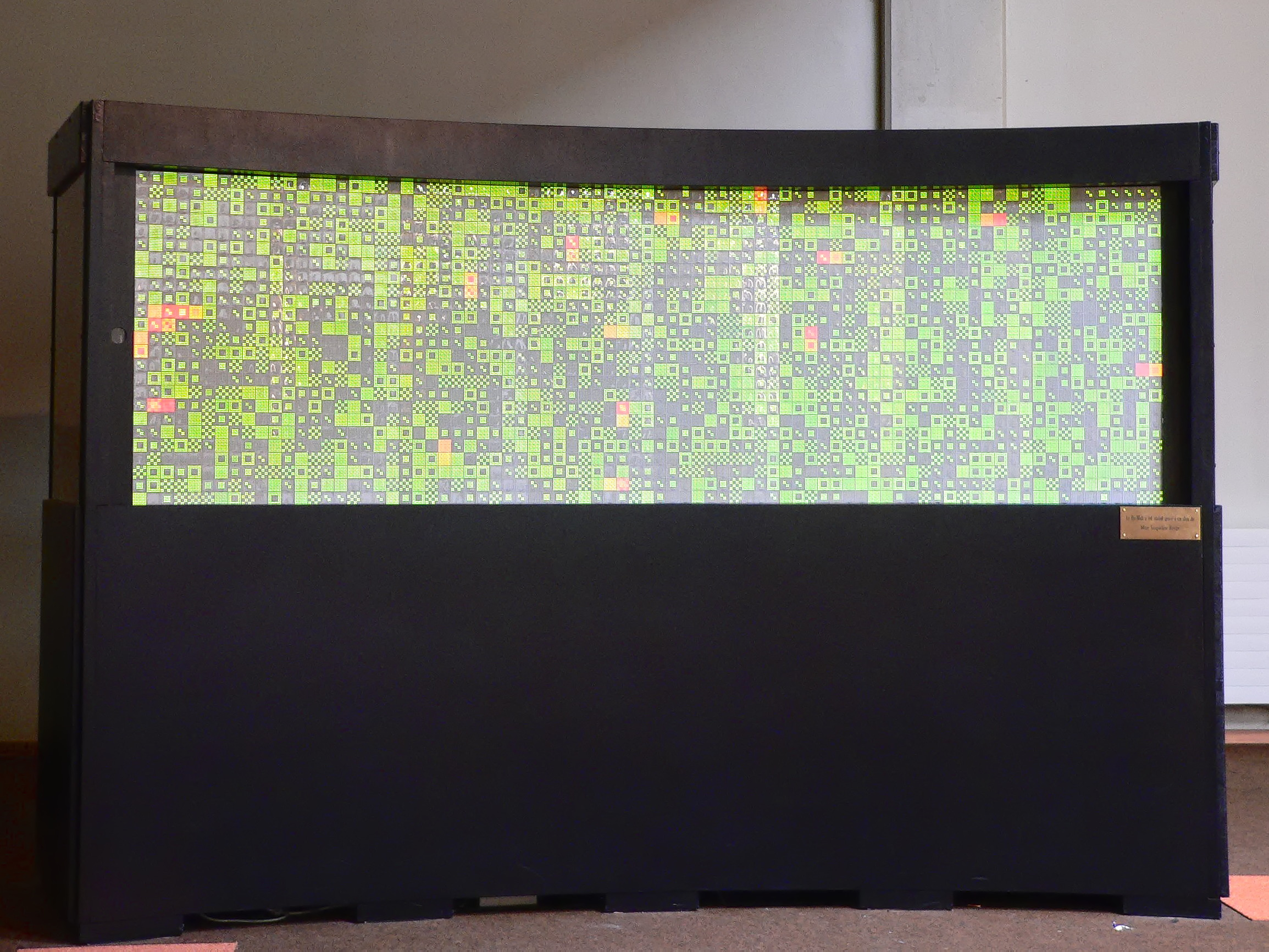
The Biowall

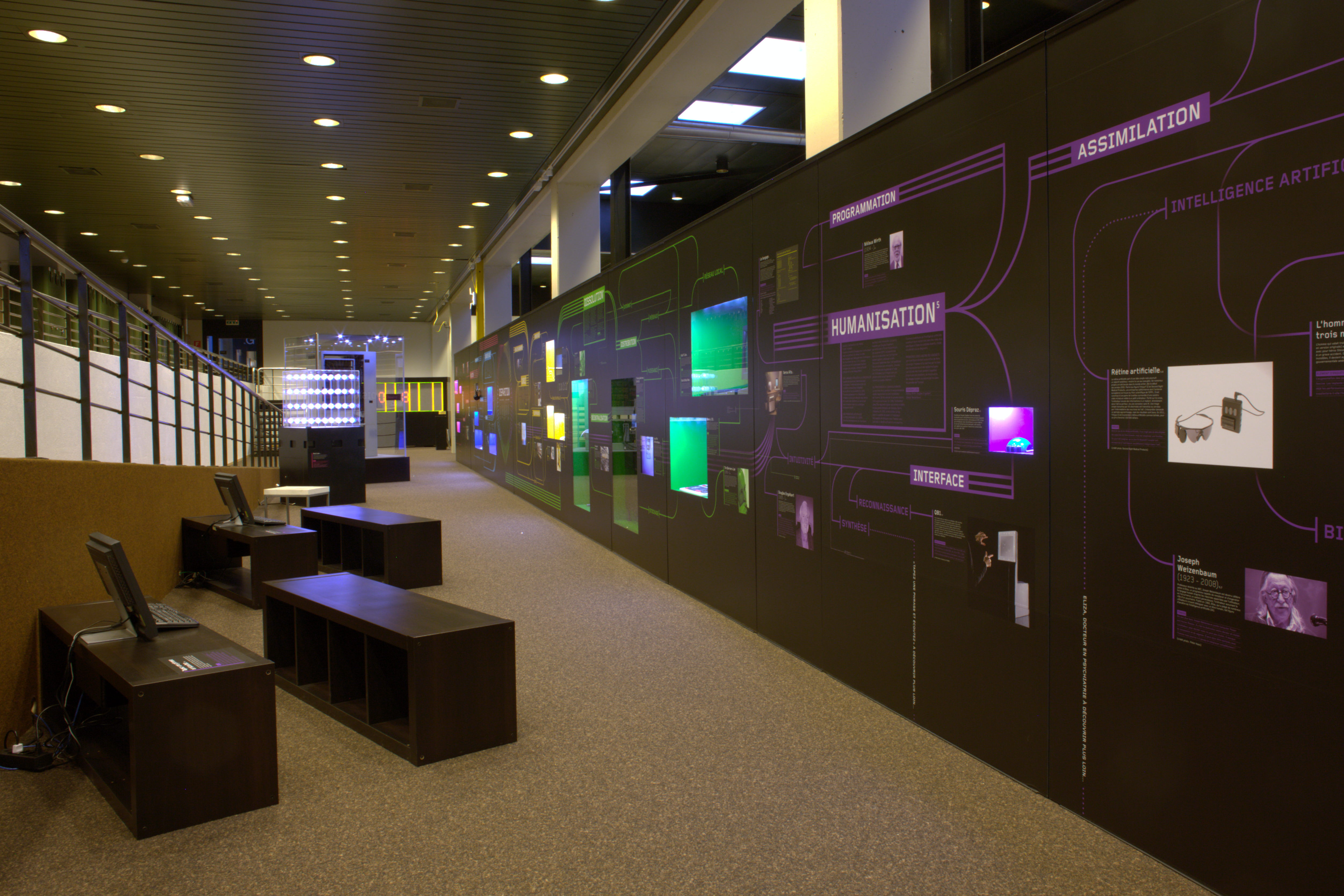
The Musée Bolo

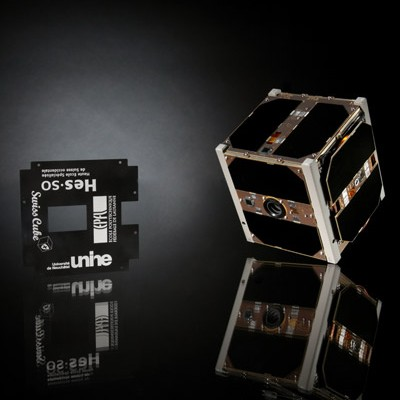
Swiss Cube 1, the first Swiss satellite

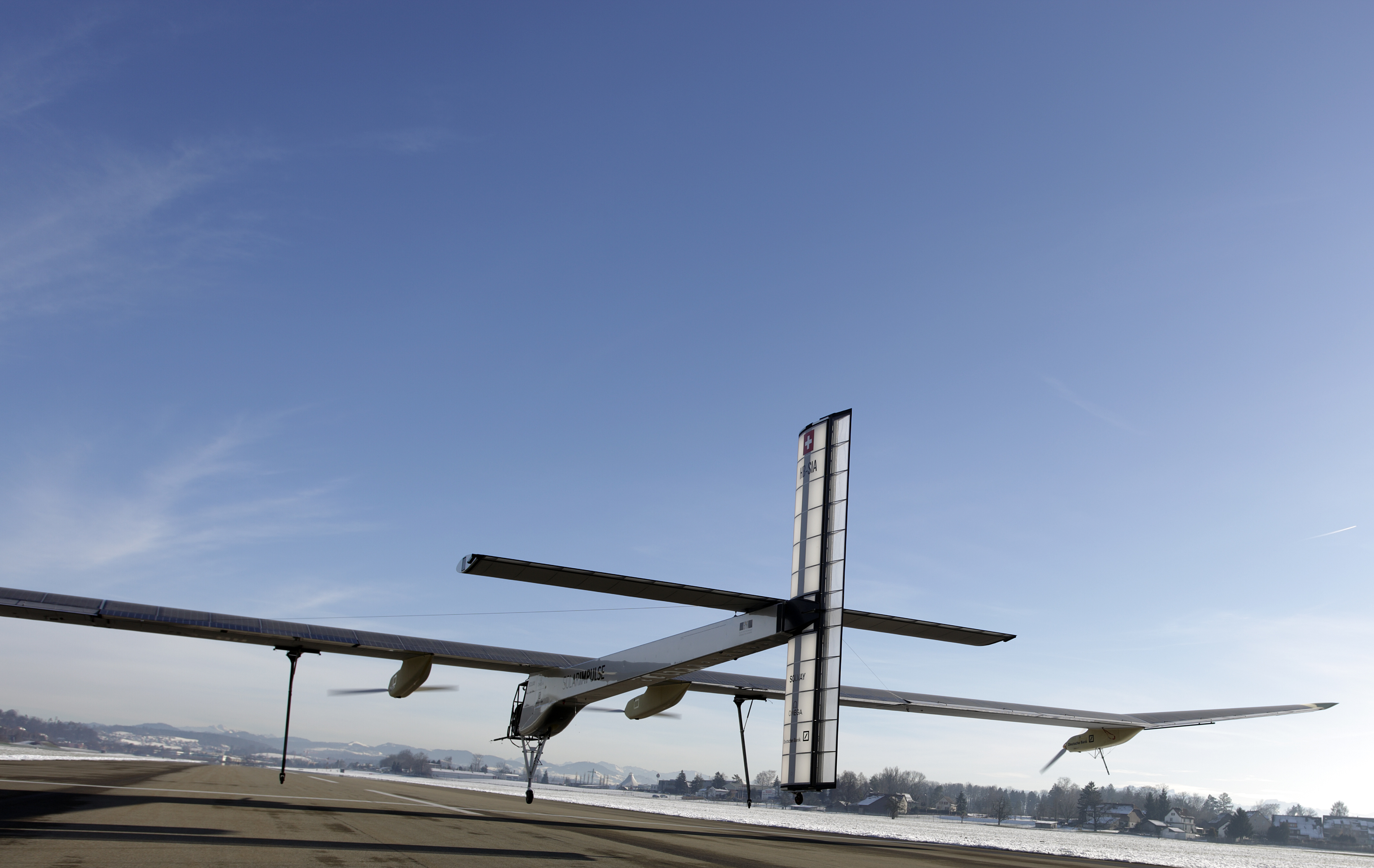
Solar Impulse achieved the first round-the-world solar flight.
- Human Brain Project: a large 10-year scientific research project, established in 2013, coordinated by Henry Markram (EPFL) and largely funded by the European Union. It aims to provide a collaborative informatics infrastructure and first draft rodent and human whole brain models within its 10-year funding period. It includes 112 research partners in 24 countries in Europe as well as outside Europe.

== See also ==
- ETH Zurich
- Science and technology in Switzerland
- Swiss Electromagnetics Research and Engineering Centre
- Top Industrial Managers for Europe
- Green building on college campuses
- Technologist, magazine published by EuroTech Universities Alliance

== Bibliography ==
- (in French) Histoire de l'École polytechnique de Lausanne : 1953-1978, Presses polytechniques et universitaires romandes, 1999 (ISBN 9782880743956).
- (in French) Michel Pont, Chronique de l'EPFL 1978-2000, Presses polytechniques et universitaires romandes, 2010 (ISBN 9782880748760).
- (in French) Libero Zuppiroli, La bulle universitaire. Faut-il poursuivre le rêve américain ? [The academic bubble. Should we pursue the American dream?], Éditions d'en bas, 2010, 176 pages (ISBN 978-2-8290-0385-1). The first part, entitled "Le parcours exemplaire du Swiss Institute of Technology Lausanne" [The exemplary path of the Swiss Institute of Technology in Lausanne], is about the change of the EPFL after the appointment of Patrick Aebischer as president.
