= Nicolas Grandjean =

French professor of physics (born 1967)

- Born: February 14, 1967 (age 59); Dijon, France
- Education: University of Clermont-Ferrand; University of Côte d'Azur (also called University of Nice before 2019)
- Scientific career
- Workplaces: École Polytechnique Fédérale de Lausanne

Nicolas Grandjean (born February 14, 1967) is a French and Swiss professor of physics. His achievements include over 600 articles.

== Biography ==
Nicolas Grandjean was born in Dijon, France, and is a French and Swiss citizen. He studied at the University of Clermont-Ferrand and the Université Nice-Sophia-Antipolis. In 1991, he joined the Solid-State Physics and Solar Energy Laboratory, a division of the French National Center for Scientific Research where he studied semiconductor nanostructures. By 1994 he obtained his Ph.D. Later on, as a senior research fellow, he worked at the Research Center for Heteroepitaxy and its Applications, a division of CNRS in Sophia Antipolis.

In 2004, he became a tenure-track professor at the École Polytechnique Fédérale de Lausanne becoming a director of the Laboratory of Advanced Semiconductors for Photonics and Electronics where he still serves. He was promoted Full Professor in 2010. From 2012 to 2016, he was the director of the Institute of Condensed Matter. From 2019 to 2026, he was a board member of Riber, a world's leading supplier of Molecular Beam Epitaxy (MBE) products.

In January 2025, he was appointed Associate Vice-President for Education at EPFL. In September 2026, the ETH Board appointed him to the Direction of EPFL as Vice President for Education.

== Research ==
In 1999, he along with his colleagues, have discovered that combining gallium nitride (GaN) and quantum dots (QDs) into aluminum nitride (AIN) matrix, produces a glowing white light. In 2006, his group and colleagues at the University of Southampton reported polariton lasing at room-temperature.
