= Philippe Thalmann =

Swiss economist

Professor Philippe Thalmann
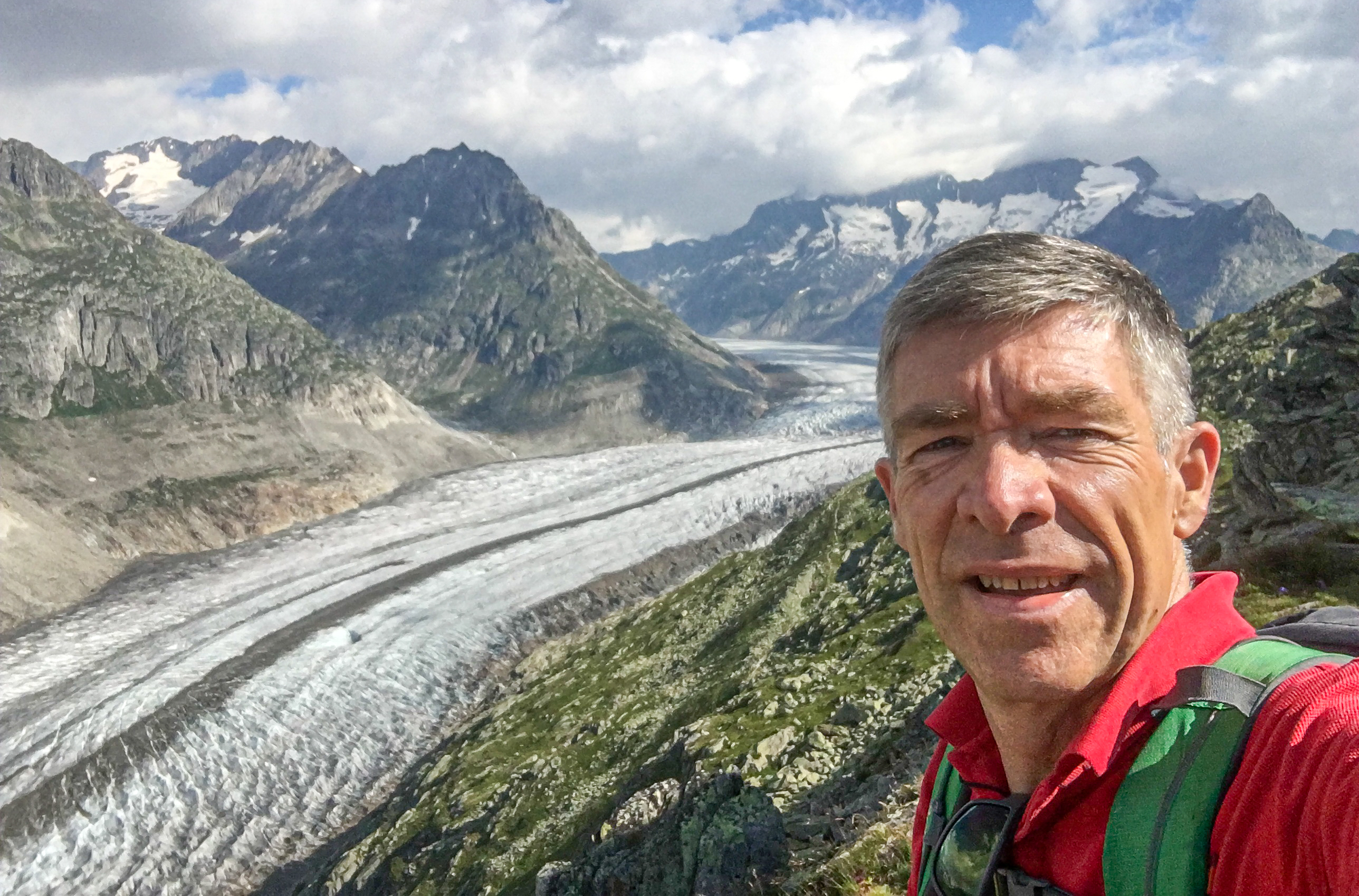
- In front of Aletsch glacier in July 2020
- Born: June 1963 (age 62); Lausanne, Switzerland
- Education: PhD in Economics
- Alma mater: Harvard University
- Scientific career
- Institutions: EPFL (École Polytechnique Fédérale de Lausanne)
- Thesis: 'Essays in the Economics of Government Revenue and Spending' (1990)
- Doctoral advisor: Lawrence Summers, Lawrence H. Goulder, Eric Maskin

Philippe Thalmann (born 11 June 1963 in Lausanne, Switzerland) is a Harvard-trained Swiss economist. He is a professor at EPFL (Ecole Polytechnique Fédérale de Lausanne).

== Career ==
Philippe Thalmann studied economics at the University of Lausanne. From 1986, he pursued a PhD at the Economics Department of Harvard University, which he received in June 1990. He was an assistant to professor Lawrence H. Goulder at the National Bureau of Economic Research. He returned to Switzerland in 1990, first as a post-doc at University of Geneva, then as an assistant professor at University of Lausanne. He was hired as an associate professor at EPFL (Ecole Polytechnique Fédérale de Lausanne) in 1994. His group became the Laboratory of Environmental and Urban Economics in 2014.

Thalmann has been a member or chairman of many political and scientific committees, e.g., chairman of the Swiss federal housing commission (2008-2019), member of the Advisory body on climate changes OcCC (2009-2021), and member of the Federal Energy Research Commission CORE (since 2023).

== Research and teaching ==
Philippe Thalmann's research extends over a vast domain that can best be described as "Economics of the natural and built environment".

== Selected works - Monographs ==
Favarger, Philippe, et Philippe Thalmann, Les Secrets de l'Expertise Immobilière. Prix et Valeur [The Secrets of Property Valuation. Price and Value] Presses Polytechniques et Universitaires Romandes, Lausanne, 2007, revised and augmented in 2008, 2009, 2012 and 2017

Thalmann, Philippe, The Dynamics of Freight Transport Development. In Switzerland and Great Britain, Ashgate, Aldershot, 2004

Cuennet, Stéphane, Philippe Favarger et Philippe Thalmann, La Politique du Logement [Housing Policy], Collection Le Savoir Suisse, Presses Polytechniques et Universitaires Romandes, Lausanne, 2002

Thalmann, Philippe, et Philippe Favarger, Locataire ou Propriétaire? Enjeux et Mythes de l'Accession à la Propriété en Suisse [Tenant or Homeowner? Issues and Myths of Homeownership in Switzerland], Presses Polytechniques et Universitaires Romandes, Lausanne, 2002

Thalmann, Philippe, Impôts Ecologiques. L'Exemple des Taxes CO_{2} [Green Taxes. The Example of Carbon Taxes], Presses Polytechniques et Universitaires Romandes, Lausanne, 1997
