= Patrick Thiran =

Electrical engineering professor

Patrick Thiran is an electrical engineering professor at École Polytechnique Fédérale de Lausanne, who was named Fellow of the Institute of Electrical and Electronics Engineers (IEEE) in 2014 for contributions to network performance analysis.

Thiran received an electrical engineering degree from the Université catholique de Louvain (UCLouvain), Louvain-la-Neuve, Belgium, an M.Sc. degree in electrical engineering from the University of California, Berkeley, USA, and Ph.D. degree from EPFL in 1996. He became an adjunct professor in 1998, an assistant professor in 2002, an associate professor in 2006 and a full professor in 2011. He was with Sprint Advanced Technology Labs in Burlingame, California from 2000 to 2001. From 1997 to 1999, Thiran served as an associate editor for the IEEE Transactions on Circuits and Systems and for the IEEE/ACM Transactions on Networking from 2006 to 2010. He currently serves on the editorial board of the IEEE Journal on Selected Areas in Communications.
