= Rüdiger Urbanke =

Austrian computer scientist

Rüdiger Leo Urbanke (born 1966) is an Austrian computer scientist and professor at École Polytechnique Fédérale de Lausanne.

== Life ==
Urbanke studied at the Technical University of Vienna with the diploma as an electrical engineer in 1988 and at the Washington University in St. Louis with the master's degree in 1992 and his doctorate in 1995 under the supervision of Bixio E. Rimoldi. He then worked at Bell Laboratories.

== Career ==
From 2000 to 2004 he was an Associate Editor of the IEEE Transactions on Information Theory. From 2009 till 2012 he was the head of the I&C Doctoral School and in 2013 he served as a Dean of I&C.

== Distinctions ==
Urbanke is a co-recipient of the 2002 and the 2013 IEEE Information Theory Society Best Paper Award, a recipient of the 2011 IEEE Koji Kobayashi Computers and Communications Award, the 2014 IEEE Richard W. Hamming Medal and the 2023 Claude E. Shannon Award. He was selected as an IEEE Distinguished lecturer by the Information theory society for 2013-2014 and received a STOC Best Paper Award in 2016.

== Bibliography ==
- Richardson, T.J.; Urbanke, R.L. (17 March 2008). Modern Coding Theory. Cambridge University Press. ISBN 978-1-139-46964-7.
- Richardson, T.J.; Urbanke, R.L. (Feb 2001). "The capacity of low-density parity-check codes under message-passing decoding". IEEE Transactions on Information Theory. 47 (2): 599–618. doi:10.1109/18.910577.
- Richardson, T.J.; Shokrollahi, M.A.; Urbanke, R.L. (Feb 2001). "Design of capacity-approaching irregular low-density parity-check codes". IEEE Transactions on Information Theory. 47 (2): 619–37. doi:10.1109/18.910578.
- Richardson, T.J.; Urbanke, R.L. (Feb 2001). "Efficient encoding of low-density parity-check codes". IEEE Transactions on Information Theory. 47 (2): 638–56. doi:10.1109/18.910579.
- Chung, S.Y.; Forney, G.D.; Richardson, T.J.; Urbanke, R. (Feb 2001). "On the design of low-density parity-check codes within 0.0045 dB of the Shannon limit". IEEE Communications Letters. 5 (2): 58–60. doi:10.1109/4234.905935. S2CID 7381972.
