= Community technology =

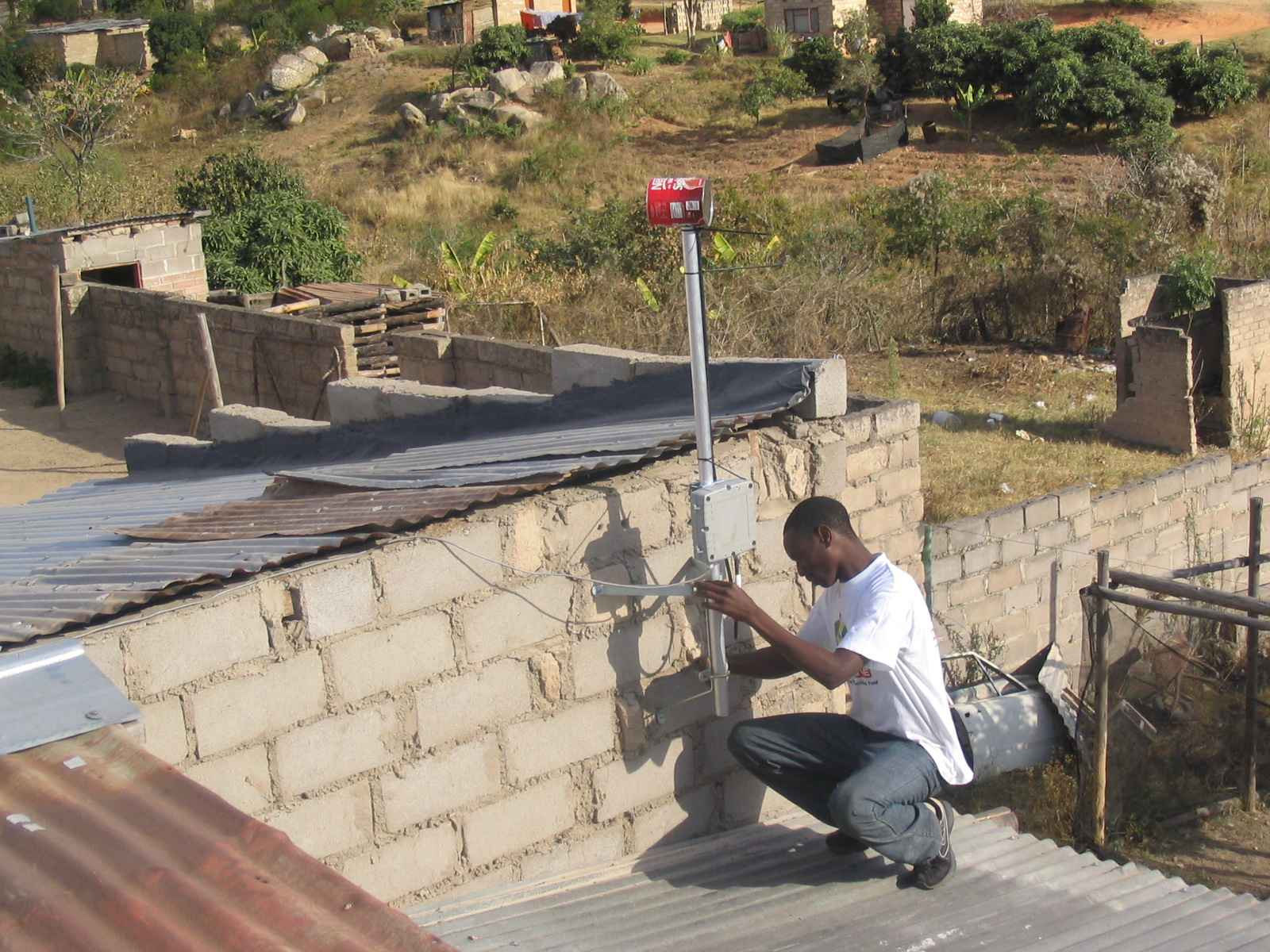
A mesh network, an example of community technology, being set up in South Africa.

Community technology, community tech for short, is a broad and diverse movement to design and build technology owned by a community to meet its needs. It's oftentimes seen as a counter example to Big Tech.

== History ==
=== 1970s: Local Self-Sufficiency ===
In the 1970s, Karl Hess and Therese Hess organized with neighbors in the Adams Morgan neighborhood to form the Adams Morgan Community Technology Project. The five year experiment used technologies like aquaponics and solar power to advance community self-sufficiency.

Karl Hess published the book Community Technology, documenting the lessons learned and philosophized on the role technology can play in advancing collective autonomy.

Hess critiqued the extreme concentration of economic and political power in the hands of the wealthy and saw community technology as a way to disperse and redistribute power.

"The most powerful point to be made for community technology efforts is that when people take any part of their lives back into their own hands for their own purposes, the cause of local liberty is advanced; and such liberty, in turn, seems the strongest base on which to found a decent culture of mutual aid and humane purpose."

Gentrification weakened the social base powering many of the community projects in Adams Morgan.

The Hess's eventually relocated to West Virginia where they applied the principles of community tech to build a largely self-sufficient home. Karl Hess taught courses on community tech at the Institute for Social Ecology.

=== 1980s and 1990s: Community Technology Centers ===
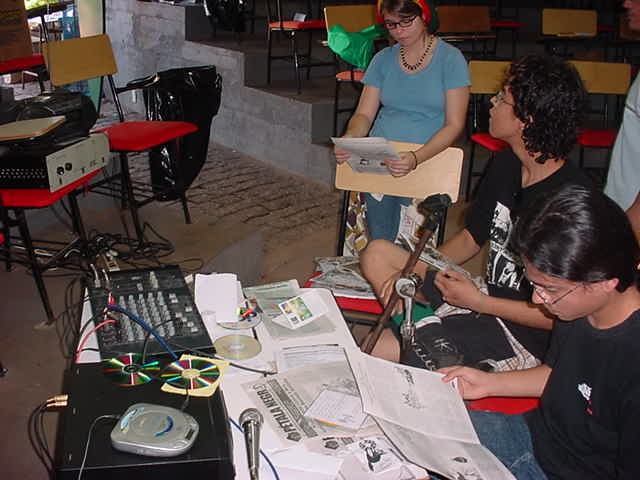
Indymedia collective at Mato Grosso Federal University in Cuiabá, Brazil, hosting a free radio broadcast in 2004

When computers became widely available, but not yet common household items, the community technology center (CTC) emerged to provide public access to computers.

Libraries and schools established computer labs available to the community. Some community technology centers were their own standalone places.

In the 1990s, Independent Media Centers were a specific form of CTC that the global justice movement used to document and broadcast its protest and events as a counter narrative to mainstream media coverage.

=== 2000s: Tech Literacy and Community Access ===
In 2001, TechSoup (then called CompuMentor) created the Community Technology Network to a "rapidly growing need for public digital literacy training." In 2008, they became their own independent nonprofit.

=== 2010s to present: Counter Power to Big Tech ===
Community organizers and technologists gathered together in 2015 for the Community Tech Network Gathering (no relation to the Community Technology Network).

This established a new framing for a community tech movement that emphasized a technology built for and by community members.

Core organizers and participants of the gathering included the Detroit Community Technology Project, Palante Tech Cooperative, the Open Technology Institute and Co.open Media Cooperative.

In the United Kingdom, a similar tendency of community tech is active via a community of practice and newsletter.

== Community Tech Definition and Examples ==
The Community Tech Project in the UK defines community tech as,

"any hardware or software that delivers benefit to a community group, and which that community group has the authority to influence or control."

Examples of community tech include:

- community technology centers
- independent media centers
- mesh networks
- platform cooperatives
- democratically governed open source software
- community solar

== See also ==
- Community technology center
- Community informatics
- Broadband
