= Digital Divide Network =

The Digital Divide Network (DDN) is an online community of activists, policymakers, researchers and concerned citizens interested in sharing knowledge to help bridge the digital divide. It is a spinoff of Helping.org (Helping.org later changed its name to Network for Good). TakingITGlobal in Toronto, Ontario, Canada produces and coordinates DDN.

== History ==
DDN was originally launched as the Digital Divide Clearinghouse in October 1999. The Clearinghouse was a section of a larger web portal called Helping.org. Launched by the America Online Foundation, the Benton Foundation, the National Urban League and other institutions, Helping.org was dedicated to volunteerism, technology capacity building for nonprofits and charitable giving. Two months after the website was launched, Bill Clinton hosted a national Digital Divide Summit in Washington D.C. During the meeting, representatives from civil society and the private sector met with Clinton; soon, the idea was hatched to create a new national Web portal dedicated to bridging the digital divide. This decision led to the Digital Divide Clearinghouse spinning off from Helping.org to become a new website, The Digital Divide Network, which was launching in December 1999 by the Benton Foundation.

DDN has become a leading website for organizations interested in sharing news, research and other resources to help bridge the digital divide. The site has become more international as well, with users from more than 75 countries. In February 2004, the site and its senior staff relocated to Massachusetts to move their operation to the Education Development Center (EDC), as part of the creation of a new institute called the EDC Center for Media & Community. DDN was then managed by director Andy Carvin. Cedar Pruitt served as website editor from April 2004 until September 2005. DDN is managed by TakingITGlobal.org, the Toronto-based NGO that redesigned the website in 2004. Andy Carvin is no longer directly involved in the website, though he continues to moderate the group's email discussion list.

== See also ==
- Digital divide−related topics
- Community informatics
- Nonprofit technology
- NTEN: The Nonprofit Technology Enterprise Network
