= Piazza telematica =

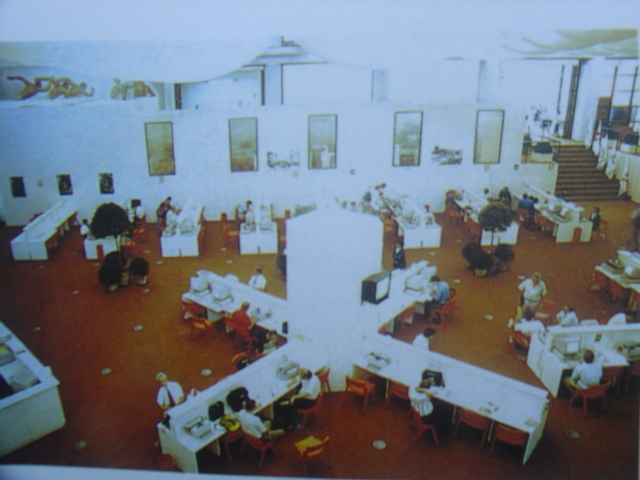
Piazzetta telematica "Italia '90" for journalists — Roma 1990.

In the fields of urban planning, urban regeneration and e-government, the term piazza telematica has been used in Italy since the early 1990s by a number of community network and local institutions for promoting the insertion, inside the urban upgrading processes, of the principles of sustainable development and of accessibility for all to IT tools for assuring the Right of Citizenship: the possibilities to participate in public decision processes, to access to the knowledge and training, to take part of the social local community life.

The term piazza telematica evokes a hybrid space indebted in equal parts to the real (with territorial components) and the virtual space that has to be considered as a whole, a new glocal (global – local) public space with a great symbolic value for the democratic interaction and for the social life.

The word "piazza" underlines the semantic significance of a public space traditionally located in the heart of the town centre or of a village and dedicated to communication, meeting, and the exchange of material goods and, at present, through the use of telematics systems and services, to the exchange also of immaterial goods (new virtual services and functions: remote work, coworking, online training through multi-monitor, telemedicine, e-commerce and the new sustainable mobility services such as bike sharing and car sharing.

== History ==
- 1990 - The term Piazza Telematica is used for the first time in newspapers and magazines in order to describe the telematics systems and services set up for the journalists in the 12 Italian cities hosting the FIFA World Cup 1990.
- 1994 - Participation to the ACT-VILL project of the Direction XII Science and Technology of the European Union for the city of the 21st century corresponding to new concepts synthesised in three scenarios:
  - Sustainable city, a city that internalise the problems it generates, solving them instead of transferring to other or to the future.
  - "Glocal" city (global/local), a city with a better balance between the globalisation process and the ability to use local resources.
  - Post-modern or agora city, a human centred city with a harmonic relationship between the citizen and the urban design.
- 1995 - Participation to the European conference Urban utopias: new tools for the European Urban Renaissance, promoted by the Direction XII Science and Technology of the European Union and hosted by the Municipality of Berlin.
- 2004 - The first pilot project of a Piazza Telematica, supported by the European Union (div. XVI for social cohesion and sustainable development) is opened to the general public in Naples (Italy) in the bourough of Scampia.

In some other pilot projects, as is the case for the Piazza Telematica of the Municipality of Provaglio d'Iseo, the term Piazza Telematica is used in order to evoke a virtual space on the Internet open to all citizens for the exchange of ideas, proposals and participation, through forum and other web instruments, to the socio-cultural and economic life of the community.

== See also ==
- New Urbanism
- Sharing economy
- Piazza
- Agora
- Digital nomad
- Generative art
- Telecentre
- Library
- Europeana
- World Digital Library
- Community informatics
- Hot desking
- Hoteling
- Telecottage
- Coworking
- Computer lab
- Fab lab
- Living lab
- Internet café
- Public computer
- Public space
- City Literary Institute
- Grid computing
