= Daniel Ben-Horin =

American political activist

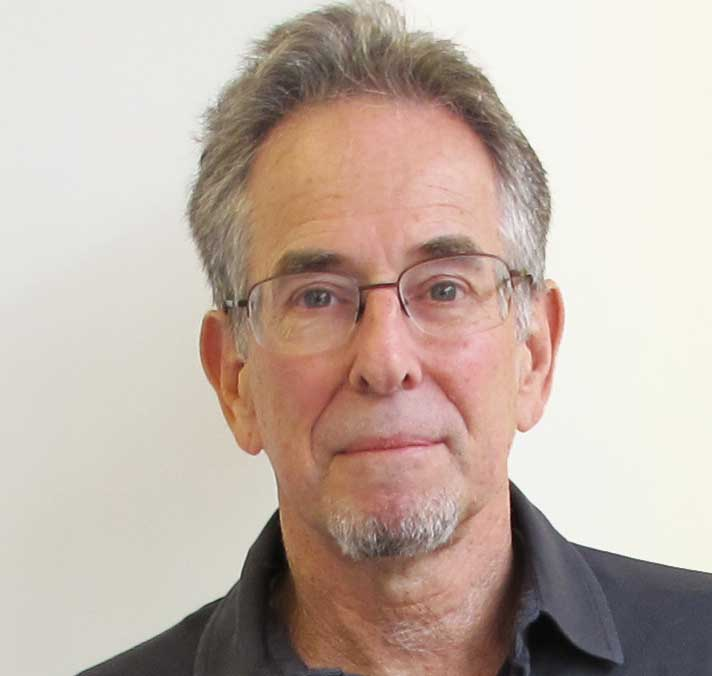
- Ben-Horin in 2013
- Occupation: social entrepreneur
- Title: Founder of TechSoup (formerly CompuMentor)

Daniel Ben-Horin is an American social entrepreneur, known for founding the technology assistance nonprofit CompuMentor, now known as TechSoup, in the late 1980s. He is also a former journalist who has written for publications such as The Arizona Republic, The Nation, The NY Times, and Mother Jones. Ben-Horin's debut novel, Substantial Justice, was published in June 2020.

== Early life and education ==
Ben-Horin was born to Jewish parents from Latvia and Ukraine, who both emigrated separately to British Mandatory Palestine and met on a kibbutz in 1930. Ben-Horin's father was a Zionist activist and journalist. After the couple moved to Queens, New York in 1945, his mother earned an M.A. from Columbia University and became a probation officer for New York City. He graduated from the University of Chicago in 1969 with a Bachelor of Arts degree.

== Career ==
=== Journalism and socialist views ===
After college, Ben-Horin lived in Phoenix, Arizona for six years, where he worked at The Arizona Republic before becoming an editor of the Phoenix New Times. In 1974, Ben-Horin moved to San Francisco. He has written for publications such as The Nation, Mother Jones and Redbook.

In 1977 he wrote the article "Television Without Tears", a socialist analysis of television and its role in popular culture and ideology, which was published in the journal Socialist Revolution.

=== Nonprofit career ===
From 1981-84, Ben-Horin served as the Executive Director of Media Alliance, a nonprofit association of media workers in the San Francisco Bay Area. In 1985, Ben-Horin became active on the Whole Earth 'Lectronic Link (WELL), where he encountered technologists who wanted to share their knowledge with nonprofits, but had no outlet to do so. The following year, Ben-Horin approached WELL members with a printer problem and was overwhelmed by the assistance he received in resolving the issue. This led to him establishing CompuMentor in San Francisco in September 1986, with the objective of trying to "help nonprofit organizations use available technical tools to produce better work and to activate a truly skilled sector of the population--technically adept people--by getting them into the community to do what they do best--talk about technology and teaching."

In April 2009, Ben-Horin received the "Lifetime Achievement Award" from the Nonprofit Technology Enterprise Network (NTEN), and two months later the Ashoka Foundation elected Ben-Horin as a Senior Fellow for his work. The NonProfit Times named Ben-Horin in its Top 50 most influential people in the nonprofit sector four years in a row from 2004 to 2007.

Ben-Horin was the CEO of TechSoup until 2013, when he became Founder and Chief Instigator, with Rebecca Masisak replacing him as CEO. As of 2017, TechSoup Global had a staff of 212 and an annual operating budget of $34 million.

=== Fiction ===
In 2013, Ben-Horin returned to his first love, writing fiction. His novel, Substantial Justice, was published in July 2020 by Rare Bird Books. Substantial Justice received positive reviews. Kirkus Reviews called it a “remarkable first novel”.

Ben-Horin's second novel, The Big Chihuahua, is scheduled for publication by Rare Bird Books on November 24,2026 and is distributed by Simon & Schuster.

.
