= Smart Living Lab =

Swiss research centre focused on the build environment

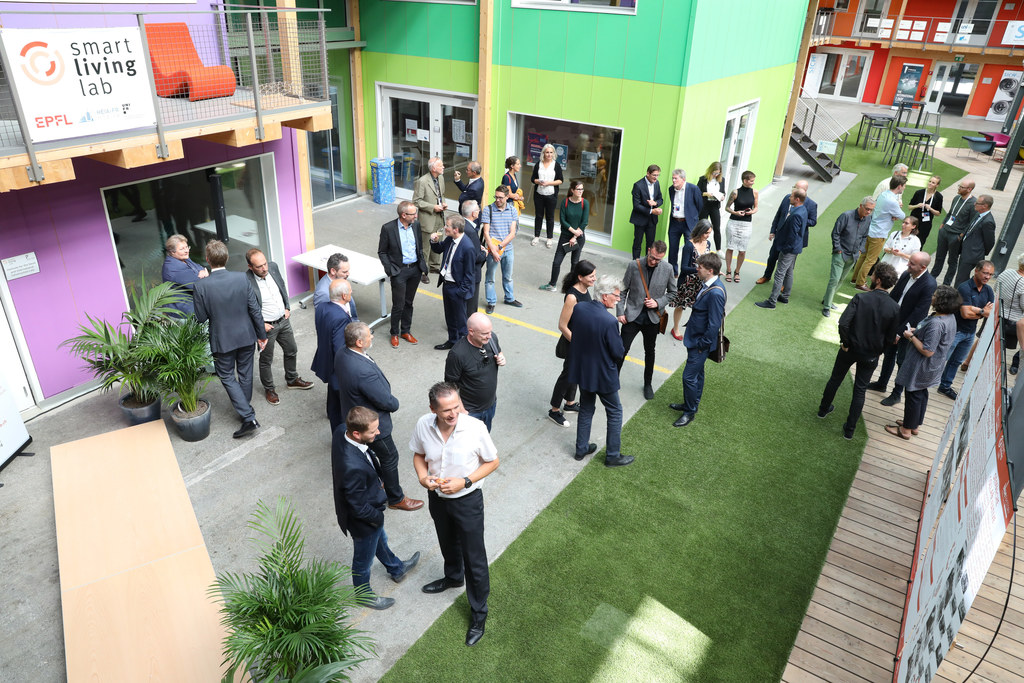
- Smart Living Lab
- Established: 2014
- Laboratory type: Research
- Research type: Basic and Applied
- Field of research: Construction technologies, well-being and behaviors, interactions and design processes, and energy systems
- Directors: Martin Gonzenbach (operations); Marilyne Andersen (academic)
- Location: Passage du Cardinal 13b, Fribourg, CH-1700, Switzerland; 46.79674°N 7.14742°E
- Founding institutions: EPFL, School of Engineering and Architecture of Fribourg, University of Fribourg
- Website: www.smartlivinglab.ch

The Smart Living Lab is an academic research and development center dedicated to contribute to the future of the built environment. Located in Fribourg in the Bluefactory innovation district, it is affiliated with the Switzerland Innovation Park Network West EPFL. This living lab focuses its research activities on human comfort and well-being in indoor spaces, environmental performance of buildings, and the digital transformation of the architecture, engineering and construction (AEC) industry.

== History ==
A collaboration between the EPFL, the School of Engineering and Architecture of Fribourg, and the University of Fribourg, the Smart Living Lab conducts interdisciplinary research since 2014 on construction technologies, energy systems, building user behavior, and design processes. It was initiated when the associated campus of EPFL Fribourg was created.

In 2017, the NeighborHub solar pavilion was designed at the Smart Living Lab through the association of its partner institutions, and the Geneva University of Art and Design. By demonstrating sustainable technologies and architecture, this project won the Solar Decathlon competition in the United States. Ever since, it has served as a community center in the Bluefactory innovation district and as a research prototype for the Smart Living Lab.

In 2018, the Smart Living Lab launched a parallel study mandate for the construction of an experimental building. In 2019, the Smart Living Lab published the result of a preliminary research dedicated to its future building in the editorial project "Towards 2050" by Park Books. This building should define environmental goals, which aim to meet the Energy Strategy 2050 of the Swiss Confederation 30 years ahead of schedule. In this context, the building will be studied to investigate ways to reduce power consumption and greenhouse gas emissions. The Smart Living Lab building, which is scheduled to open in 2024, will provide workspace for the 130 members of 11 research teams from the EPFL, the School of Engineering and Architecture of Fribourg, and the University of Fribourg.

In 2021, the Smart Living Lab joined the European network of living labs Enoll. Also in 2021, the Smart Living Lab demonstrated the recycling of concrete for the construction of a footbridge prototype.

== Structure ==
The Smart Living Lab is composed of research groups from three universities in Fribourg:

- The EPFL: Structural Xploration Lab (SXL), Laboratory of Construction and Architecture (FAR), Integrated Comfort Engineering (ICE), Human-Oriented Built Environment Lab (HOBEL), and Building2050 (BUILD)
- The School of Engineering and Architecture of Fribourg: Institute of Applied Research in Energy Systems (ENERGY), Institute of Architecture: Heritage, Construction and Users (TRANSFORM), and Institute of Construction and Environmental Technologies (iTEC),
- The University of Fribourg: international institute of management in technology (iimt), Human-IST Institute, and Institute for Swiss and International Construction Law

== Publication ==
- Exploring : research-driven building design. Marilyne Andersen, Emmanuel Rey. Zurich, Switzerland. 2019. ISBN 978-3-03860-132-6. OCLC 1065915263.
