= TechSoup =

US nonprofit organization based in San Francisco

- Founded: 1987
- Founder: Daniel Ben-Horin
- Type: Nonprofit technology
- Purpose: Technology Donations and Data Services
- Location: San Francisco
- Origins: CompuMentor Project
- Key people: Founder and Chief Instigator: Daniel Ben-Horin; CEO: Rebecca Masisak
- Revenue: US$30.8 million
- Employees: 203
- Website: meet.techsoup.org

TechSoup, founded in 1987 as CompuMentor and later known as TechSoup Global, is a nonprofit international network of non-governmental organizations (NGOs) that provides technical support and technological tools to other nonprofits.

== History ==
After discussing the technology needs of nonprofits with members of the WELL, Daniel Ben-Horin founded CompuMentor (later TechSoup). His objective was to create a program in which those with technology skills ("mentors") volunteered to assist nonprofit organizations with information technologies. In 1991, Fred Silverman, Apple Computer's manager of community affairs, praised CompuMentor as "a perfect marriage of technology and volunteerism."

CompuMentor also began soliciting donations of technological products, largely from tech magazines that had large stocks of unneeded software sent to them by companies seeking coverage of their products, which CompuMentor collected and then sold to nonprofits for a nominal fee, originally $5.

In 1997, CompuMentor received $350,000 in donations, tying it with the IT Resource Center as the largest Nonprofit Technology Assistance Provider in the U.S.

On May 9, 2000, TechSoup website www.techsoup.org was launched.

In 2008, the organization changed its name to TechSoup Global.

As of 2016, TechSoup reported $30.8 million in revenue. It provides technology assistance services and NGO validation services to nongovernmental organizations, foundations, libraries, and other civil society organizations worldwide in partnerships with companies like Microsoft, Adobe, Cisco and Symantec. In partnership with Microsoft, it formed the TechSoup Global Network to support increased distribution of services to nonprofits.

The TechSoup Global Network includes Fundacja TechSoup, a separately incorporated "regional hub" established by TechSoup Global. It is based in Warsaw, Poland, and supports activities in 48 European countries.

== Notable programs ==
=== TechSoup.org ===
Launched in January 2002, TechSoup.org is a web site serving nonprofits that provides training webinars, community forums and other resources about the use of technology in nonprofit organizations and public libraries. TechSoup partners with Microsoft to distribute Microsoft's product donations globally, and helps to connect nonprofits and libraries to corporate donors such as Adobe, Symantec, Cisco and Intuit. TechSoup.org also verifies the nonprofit status of organizations seeking donations and matches them to the donated technology products they need.

=== GuideStar International ===
GuideStar International is a global service that provides open access to accurate NGO data. GSI was begun in 2010 when TechSoup Global and GuideStar International, a U.K.-registered charity that promotes transparency and civil society organization reporting, combined operations.

=== NGOsource ===
NGOsource Logo

NGOsource, a project of the Council on Foundations and TechSoup Global, is an online service for U.S. grantmakers to receive equivalency determinations, which are legal certifications that a non-U.S. NGO is equivalent to a U.S. public charity, thereby reducing the cost and complexity of international grantmaking. Launched in March 2013, it helps U.S. grantmakers streamline their global philanthropy. According to its website, NGOsource was active in 126 countries as of 2018.

=== NetSquared ===
NetSquared Logo

NetSquared organized local actors to collaborate in open innovation challenges, as well as monthly face-to-face meetups. NetSquared was organized into local chapters that had monthly meetings. Chapters went by such names as Tech4Good or NetSquared Chicago. NetSquared's "ReStart Slovakia" challenge provided recognition and seed funds to help launch the "Open Courts" project to promote transparency in Slovakia's judicial system. TechSoup Connect became the successor to NetSquared in 2021, and each chapter continues to be led by a volunteer who produces local events, in-person and online.

=== Quad ===
In February 2022, TechSoup launched a subscription service, Quad, which it described as "TechSoup's peer-to-peer community where nonprofit organizations connect with tech experts and each other to do great things."

== See also ==
- Circuit Rider
- NetAid
- NetDay
- Nonprofit technology
- NTAP
- NTEN
