= HusITa =

Human Services Information Technology Association

husITa (Human Services Information Technology Association) was an international virtual association – and a registered US non-profit organization – established with the mission of promoting the ethical and effective use of information technology in the human services. The main focus of husITa, and the claim to expertise of its associates, is situated at the intersection of three core domains: information technology, human services, and social development. husITa pursued its mission through international conferences, publications and research dissemination directed at technology applications and innovations that promote social well-being. husITa dissolved as an organization in 2026.

For much of its early history husITa operated as an informal international network of human service academics and practitioners. One of the outcomes of its first international conference – husITa1 held in 1987 in Birmingham, England – was the establishment of a working group to determine the feasibility of an international body 'to highlight the importance of human service computing, to guide developments, and to foster international co-operation'.

The working group was composed of Hein de Graaf (Netherlands), Walter LaMendola (US), Dick Schoech (US), and Stuart Toole (UK). Initial projects identified by the working group included the development of research agendas, position papers, repositories of information, and promoting a second husITa conference in 1989. Bryan Glastonbury was later added to the group as secretary. The working group met in Colorado, Denver for three days in May 1988 and published a report on the issues that a husITa international organization would need to address.

Although the 1988 Denver meeting agreed on its objectives, husITa wasn't formally established as an organization for another twelve years. The structure of the formal organization was later agreed to at Denver in 2000. The founding members at the Denver 2000 meeting were: Hein de Graaf, Walter LaMendola, Rob MacFadden, Jo Ann Regan, Jackie Rafferty, Jan Steyaert, Dick Schoech, Stuart Toole, and Victor Savtschenko.

In Colorado, local and state Human Service Departments have been providing adequate, quality, client care since the 1950s, with innovations in service programs, resources, and technology, the consistency and type of care is ever changing. In recent years, there has been a substantial shortage of human service programs as well as service professionals within small, rural towns within Colorado. These obstacles seem to be caused by a steadily increasing population of relocating residents, with El Paso County, Colorado (80 miles South of Denver), nearing the largest county population growth in the state of Colorado with roughly 12,526 new residents in the year 2017 alone. By expanding the use of technology to improve the way information and resources are both shared and managed, the barriers of providing accessible, cost effective, services directly and indirectly can be overcome.

== Objectives ==
husITa's objectives (agreed by the 1988 Denver working group) are to:

- Facilitate international cooperation in human service technology.
- Collect and disseminate information on human service technology, including tackling the problems of language translation.
- Provide technical assistance in human service technology and encourage the involvement of countries with a less developed human service IT infrastructure.
- Stimulate international discussion on key human service technology issues and encourage position papers in areas such as security/privacy/confidentiality, curriculum content and teaching methods, and ethical issues in systems/software development and use.
- Encourage publications about human service information technology.
- Encourage international research efforts.
- Encourage standards for making human service technology culturally independent.

== Journal of Technology in Human Services ==
The Journal of Technology in Human Services was the official journal of husITa. Formerly known as Computers in Human Services it was launched in 1985 as a Haworth Press publication. Dick Schoech, a professor of social work at the University of Texas at Arlington, was its founding editor. The Journal of Technology in Human Services is a peer-reviewed, refereed journal now published by Taylor & Francis and sponsored by NTEN. Its scope includes the potential of information and communication technologies in mental health, developmental disability, welfare, addictions, education, and other human services. The current editor-in-chief is Dr. Lauri Goldkind (Professor, Fordham University, US), Dr. Mamello Thinyane (Principal Research Fellow, United Nations University Institute Macau, SAR), associate editor, and Professor Amanda Taylor-Beswick (Founding Director of the Centre of Digital Transformation, Vice Chancellor's Office, and Professor of Digital and Social Sciences, Institute of Health, University of Cumbria) book review editor.

== International conferences ==
husITa1: husITa's first international conference was held in September 1987 in Birmingham, England.

husITa2: Computer Technology and Human Services in the 90s: Advancing Theory and Practice, June 1991 in New Brunswick, New Jersey.

husITa3: Information Technology and the Quality of Life and Services, June 1993 in Maastricht, the Netherlands. The same year saw the formation of a husITa Foundation in the Netherlands which continued until its disestablishment in 2003.

husITa4: Information Technology in the Human Services: Dreams and Realities, June 1996 in Lapland, Finland.

husITa5: Social Services in the Information Society: Closing the GAP, August–September 1999 in Budapest, Hungary.

husITa6: Technology and Human Services in a Multicultural Society, September 2001, in Charleston, South Carolina. However, the conference was cut short as a result of the terrorist attacks in the USA on 11 September 2001. A brief husITa board meeting was held, the by-laws were approved, and officers were elected.

husITa7: Digital Inclusion-Building a Digital Inclusive Society, August 2004 in Hong Kong, China. It had been delayed from its planned date of 2003 due to an outbreak of SARS.

husITa8: Information Technology and Diversity in Human Services: Promoting Strength Through Difference, August 2007 in Toronto, Canada.

husITa9: ICT as a Context for Human Services, June 2010 in Hong Kong, China. This event was held in conjunction with the 2010 Joint World Conference on Social Work and Social Development.

husITa14: Sustainable & Ethical use of Technology. July 9–12, Melbourne, Australia. Held in conjunction with the 2014 Joint World Conference on Social Work, Education, and Social Development.

husITa16: June 29, 2016, Seoul, Korea. Held in conjunction with the 2016 Joint World Conference on Social Work, Education, and Social Development.

husITa18: July 4-7, 2018, Dublin, Ireland. Held in conjunction with the 2018 Joint World Conference on Social Work, Education, and Social Development.

== Related human service technology initiatives ==
husITa was built on the activity of an international network of human service organizations, academics and practitioners in the USA, the UK and the Netherlands. The section below highlights some of the key organizations, people and events.

=== Early developments ===
In 1978, Gunther R. Geiss, a professor of social work at Adelphi University, New York, conducted a survey of US schools of social work. The survey sought to identify faculty members who had used computers in their administrative, teaching or research activities, or who had consulted or participated in the design and development of computer-based information systems. There were over 80 positive responses indicating a wide range of activities and levels of involvement. The survey initiated the development of a system to track and communicate with individuals with expertise in computers and human services.

Walter LaMendola, professor of social work at the University of Denver in Colorado, described an incident during a social work conference in 1979 suggesting early indications of the resistance of some social work professionals to computer use in the human services. This is a theme which has continued throughout the history of technology use in the human services and continues to the present day. Some aspects of this resistance can be considered as a well-founded concern about the ethical issues surrounding human service technology applications. However, other aspects of technology resistance seem to be a less rational form of Neo-Luddism.

=== Computer Use in Social Services Network (CUSSN) ===
Growing interest in the use of technology in the human services led a group of US human service technology specialists, meeting at a Council of Social Work Education conference in Louisville, Kentucky, in 1981, to form the Computer Use In Social Services Network (CUSSN). By the end of 1981 the network had over 350 members. The CUSSN newsletter continued in print until 1992 when it was merged with the first academic journal on human service technology Computers in Human Services.

In 1984 Gunther Geiss was sponsored by the Silberman Fund to organize the Wye Plantation Conference on Human Services Technology. Conference members developed pre-conference position papers via EYES: a centralized email system.

In 1985, CUSSN developed CUSSNet CUSSNet, a PC and FidoNet based networking system that automatically exchanged emails between members each night during off-peak telephone hours. FidoNet was a PC distributed email, bulletin board, and file sharing system that preceded the Internet. CUSSNet quickly developed nodes in major cities in the US, the UK, and the Netherlands.

The name husITa (Human Service Information Technology Applications) was coined in 1983 by Walter LaMendola and Brian Klepinger at the University of Denver.

The Human Service Microcomputer Conference was held in Seattle.

=== Computer Applications in Social Work (CASW) ===
In 1984 Stuart Toole formed Computer Applications in Social Work (CASW) in the UK to set up and run national conferences and to publish the CASW journal.

Based on the success of the first UK technology conferences, Stuart Toole, Walter LaMendola, and Brian Klepinger agreed to pursue an international conference in 1987: this conference was to become HUSITA's first international conference HUSITA1.

The CASW journal was later renamed New Technology in the Human Services in [when] and continued in publication under this title until it was closed in 2003.

In 1986 the second UK conference held on social welfare computing was held.

=== The Centre for Human Service Technology (CHST) ===
In 1985 Bryan Glastonbury, from the University of Southampton published Computers in Social Work, the first major academic text on technology and human services. In the same year the University of Southampton began publishing the journal New Technology in the Human Services under the editorship of Bryan Glastonbury. In the same year the University of Southampton established the Centre for Human Service Technology (CHST) with Jackie Rafferty as Director. In 2007, Jan Steyaert joined as adjunct research professor and together they edited a special issue of the British Journal of Social WorkB on social work in the digital age. The Centre for Human Service Technology is based at the University of Southampton in England. CHST is an international, multi-disciplinary research center focused on influencing the appropriate use of technology in social work practice and education and researching its implementation and impact.

In July 1997 the CTI Centre for Human Services held a conference on Social Services and Learning Technology hosted by the Institute for Health and Community Services at the University of Bournemouth.

In 2003 The journal New Technology in Human Services ceased publication.

=== The European Network for Information Technology in Human Services (ENITH) ===
In 1986 Hein de Graaf, Director of the CREON foundation in the Netherlands, organised the first of a series of three-day gatherings. The CREON foundation was a Dutch foundation for computer research, expertise and support in field of the human services. The gatherings, called WELCOM, were designed to increase the knowledge and understanding of information technology in the Dutch human services. WELCOM1 was held in 1986 in Bussum with Walter LaMendola as the main international speaker. WELCOM2, a smaller Dutch-only conference, took place in 1987, again in Bussum. The next WELCOM event, WELCOM3: a combined conference and fair, was held jointly with HUSITA3 in Maastricht in 1993.

Following the success of HUSITA's first international conference held in Birmingham in 1987 the Dutch Ministry of Social Welfare, Health and Cultural Affairs organized an informal meeting of European experts in the field of Information Technology and Human Services. The meeting was one of the outcomes of a feasibility study carried out by the CREON foundation, concerning international cooperation in this field. A main conclusion of this feasibility study was that an international (European) network should be established for the exchange of products, ideas, expertise, experiences and skills with respect to the introduction and use of IT in the human services. As a first step in this approach the informal meeting of experts was organized. The European network of organizations was called ENITH (European Network Information Technology and Human services).

In 1992 an ENITH3 Expert Meeting on "IT Applications and the Quality of Life and Services" was held in The Netherlands.

In 1994, from September 21 to September 23 an ENITH4 conference was held in Berlin, Germany. Bernd kolleck chaired this conference.

In September 1995 a CAUSA5/ENITH5 conference on "The Impact of Information Technology on Social Policy" was held in Eindhoven, The Netherlands. Jan Steyaert chaired this conference.
