= APTN =

APTN may stand for:

- Aboriginal Peoples Television Network, Canadian broadcast and cable television network
- Asia-Pacific Telecentre Network, collaborative initiative of the United Nations
- Associated Press Television News, global video news agency
