= Small office/home office =

Category of business or cottage industry that involves 1 to 10 workers

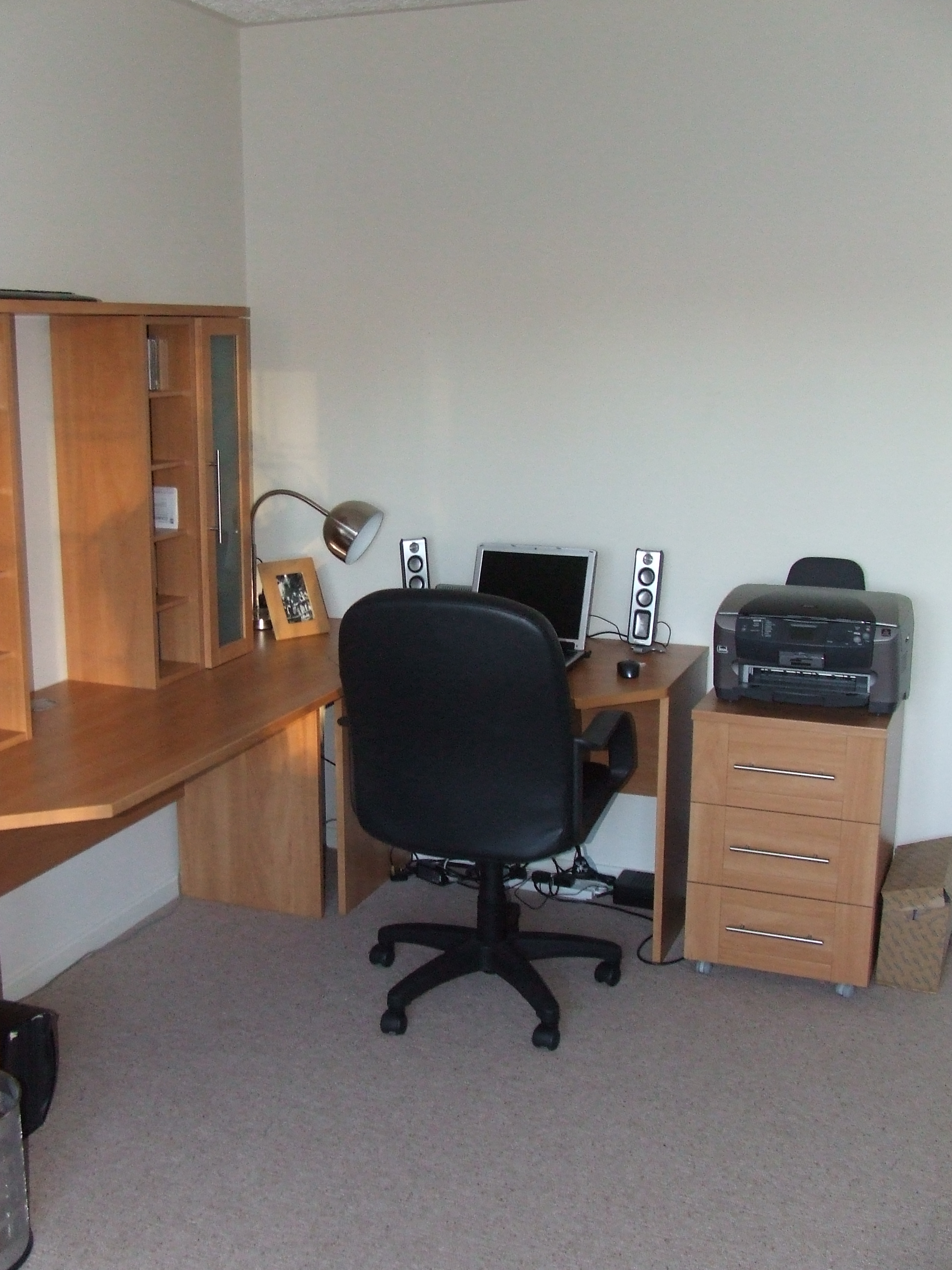
Home office

Small office/home office (or single office/home office; sometimes shortened to SOHO) refers to the category of business or cottage industry that involves from one to ten workers. In New Zealand, the Ministry of Business, Innovation and Employment (MBIE) defines a small office as 6–19 employees and a micro office as 1–5.

== History ==
Before the 19th century, and the spread of the Industrial Revolution around the globe, nearly all offices were small offices and/or home offices, with only a few exceptions. Most businesses were small, and the paperwork that accompanied them was limited. The industrial revolution aggregated workers in factories, to mass-produce goods. In most circumstances, the white collar counterpart—office work—was aggregated as well in large buildings, usually in cities or densely populated suburban areas.

Beginning in the mid-1980s, the advent of the personal computer and fax machine, plus breakthroughs in telecommunications, created opportunities for office workers to decentralize. Decentralization was also perceived as benefiting employers in terms of lower overheads and potentially greater productivity.

== Professions ==
Many consultants and the members of such professions like lawyers, real estate agents, and surveyors in small and medium-sized towns operate from home offices.

Several ranges of products, such as the armoire desk, all-in-one printer, virtual assistants, home servers and network-attached storage are designed specifically for the SOHO market. A number of books and magazines have been published and marketed specifically at this type of office. These range from general advice texts to specific guidebooks on such challenges as setting up a small PBX for the office telephones.

Technology has also created a demand for larger businesses to employ individuals who work from home. Sometimes these people remain as independent businesspersons, and sometimes they become employees of a larger company.

The small office home office has undergone a transformation since its advent as the Internet has enabled anyone working from a home office to compete globally. Technology has made this possible through email, the World-Wide Web, e-commerce, videoconferencing, remote desktop software, VPN, VLAN, webinar systems, and telephone connections by VOIP. Due to the increase in small and home offices, web services and standard business software have been created to directly assist smaller businesses in standard business practice.

In many countries, a home office can be claimed as a tax deduction only if office space and supplies are not provided by a corporate office.

== See also ==
- Home business
- Hot desking
- Hoteling
- Nomad worker
- Outsourcing
- Remote work
- Study (room)
- Telecentre
- Telecottage
- Virtual assistant
