= Michael Gurstein =

- Born: October 2, 1944; Edmonton, Alberta, Canada
- Died: October 8, 2017 (aged 73); Canada
- Education: Ph.D. Sociology, University of Cambridge
- Occupations: Academic, researcher, policy adviser, civil society
- Years active: 1972-2017
- Spouse: Fernande Faulkner
- Children: 2

Michael Gurstein (October 2, 1944 – October 8, 2017) was a Canadian best known for his work in the development and definition of community informatics as the area of research and practice concerned with enabling and empowering communities through the use of information and communications technology. He was a native of Edmonton, Alberta, but grew up in Melfort, Saskatchewan and did his first degree at the University of Saskatchewan in Philosophy and Politics.

Gurstein held a PhD in Social Science from Cambridge University.

== Early working life ==
Gurstein worked as a senior civil servant for the Province of British Columbia in 1972–1974 and for the Province of Saskatchewan (Department of Northern Saskatchewan) in 1974–1975. He then established and ran a management consulting firm, Socioscope, undertaking research linking organizations to information technology. While working as a management adviser at the United Nations in New York (1992–1995), he was offered a post as Associate Chair in the Management of Technological Change at the University College of Cape Breton. While on Cape Breton Island, he founded the Centre for Community and Enterprise Networking (C/CEN) as a community-based research laboratory (what has now come to be known as a living lab) exploring possible applications of information and communications technologies to support social change in what was then one of Canada's most economically disadvantaged regions. C/CEN, established in 1996, was a pioneer in online conference management, among other areas, and held the first online conference with simultaneous translation using IRC and court translators to provide text translation in French simultaneous to the direct meeting being transcribed in English. The centre also undertook the first NetCorps placement (in Angola) and provided online support to the local Cape Breton music industry.

== Community informatics ==
Gurstein's book Community Informatics: Enabling Communities with Information and Communications Technologies (Idea Group, 2000) and the conceptual framing for community informatics grew out of his experiences in Cape Breton. The book was the first major publication in the community informatics field, and introduced the term "community informatics" into wider usage as referring to the research and praxis discipline underpinning the social appropriation of information technology. Within the area of community informatics, a major contribution has been Gurstein's introduction of the notion of "effective use" as a critical analytical framework for assessing technology implementation superseding approaches based on the more commonly accepted frameworks such as that of the "digital divide".

The co-edited book Connecting Canadians: Investigations in Community Informatics, was published in 2012, based on the work of the Community Research Alliance for Community Innovation and Networking (CRACIN), a major community informatics research project of which Gurstein was a co-principal investigator.

== Later activities - academic and civil society ==
Gurstein was the Editor in Chief of the Journal of Community Informatics, was Foundation Chair of the Community Informatics Research Network and moderates the Community Informatics and Community Informatics Researchers, an adjunct professor in the School of Library and Information Studies in Vancouver Canada, and was formerly Research Professor at the New Jersey Institute of Technology in Newark, New Jersey, and Research Professor at the University of Quebec (Outaouais). He was also a member of the High Level Panel of Advisers of the UN's Global Alliance for ICT and Development. He also served on the Board of the Global Telecentre Alliance, Telecommunities Canada, the Pacific Community Networking Association and the Vancouver Community Net.

In more recent years he had become active as a commentator, speaker and essayist/blogger articulating a community informatics (grassroots ICT user) perspective in the areas of open government data and Internet governance. Until 2016, Gurstein wrote a community informatics blog.

== Death ==
Gurstein died on October 8, 2017, after a two-year battle with prostate cancer.

== Principal publications ==
- Clement, Andrew; Gurstein, Michael; Longford, Graham; Moll, Marita; Shade, Leslie Regan, eds. (2012). Connecting Canadians: Investigations in Community Informatics. doi:10.15215/aupress/9781926836041.01. ISBN 9781926836058.
- Gurstein, Michael (2007). What is Community Informatics (And Why Does It Matter)?. Polimetrica. arXiv:0712.3220. ISBN 978-88-7699-097-7.
- Gurstein, Michael (2000). Community Informatics: Enabling Communities with Information and Communications Technologies. Idea Group Pub. ISBN 1878289691.
- Gurstein, Michael (2003). "Effective use: A community informatics strategy beyond the Digital Divide". First Monday. 8 (12). doi:10.5210/fm.v8i12.1107.
- Gurstein, Michael (1999). "Flexible networking, information and communications technology and local economic development". First Monday. 4 (2). doi:10.5210/fm.v4i2.649.
- Gurstein M., and Civille, R.: Towards a Citizen’s Technology: Final Report to the Ford Foundation on a Sector Analysis of the Community Informatics Systems Sector, 2004.
- Gurstein M., Menou M., and Stafeev S., (Eds.): Community Networking and Community Informatics: Prospects, Approaches and Instruments. Part 1: Global Experience St. Petersburg, CCNS, 2003 (English and Russian)
