= Digital divide in Malaysia =

Differences in access to information technologies

The digital divide in Malaysia refers to the gap between people who have access to certain technologies within the country of Malaysia. The presence of the digital divide is due to several factors that include age, location, and wealth, all of which can contribute to the gap in availability of information communication technology (ICT). Malaysia is not a fully developed country, which has led some researchers to express concern that the limited access to ICT may cause the country to fall even further behind in the progress of worldwide technology if this issue is not addressed and mended.

== Causes of the digital divide in Malaysia ==
The digital divide in Malaysia is not a single cause and single effect problem. Factors contributing to the Digital Divide can be found in multiple categories and/or demographics within Malaysia. These can include factors such as age, education, wealth, and location, among others.

Age, in respects to young vs. elderly, are a small factor when looking at the widespread lack of ICT (and capable users of such technology) within Malaysia. It is a pre-dominantly known fact throughout much of the world that most older generations have less experience with technology in general, which further reinforces that young age vs. old age may be a factor in digital divide, but not specific to Malaysia. Though the elderly are recognized as one of several groups venerable to being lost to technology, the aging population is not the main focus when looking at bridging the digital divide in Malaysia.

Location within the country, along with the wealth surrounding certain areas, however, play a larger role in either bridging or creating the digital divide in Malaysia. Overall broadband penetration rate for the entire country was measured at 67.2%, averaged. However, in highly populated and more wealthy areas, that rate jumps up to 115.7% at its highest difference. This shows a measurable neglect to urban areas in need of ICT. Out of a collective 8,500 primary and secondary schools in Malaysia, most of these are location in rural areas. Because the factors contributing to the digital divide in Malaysia overlap each other so commonly, this neglect to bridge the gap of digital technology and usage in the urban areas, particularly, further contributes to the digital divide. This is a problem that is beginning to be addressed by several means of mending discussed in a later section of this article.

Education as a cause of the digital divide is an extremely important factor of the digital divide and one that Malaysia appears to be the most fixated on mending. A more detailed explanation of how education is affecting the digital divide in Malaysia follows in a subsequent section.

== Effect of education ==
One of the most prominent causes of the digital divide in Malaysia is education because there is a great disparity in the education level of Malaysian citizens. This is due in part to the lack of computer education programs prior to 1991, when Vision 2020 was initiated by the Malaysian government. Vision 2020 was initiated to try to increase computer usage skills among Malaysian citizens. Since Vision 2020 was not started until 1991, this means there is a large group of Malaysian citizens who grew up prior to 1991 who have never been exposed to computer literacy education. Schools in many of Malaysia's rural areas also did not have access to computers of the internet before this program was implemented.

In addition to lack of formal computer education in much of the Malaysian population, it has been shown that people with lower levels of general education are also less likely to be comfortable using computers.

Because people who are educated are more likely to use computers, they have more opportunity to increase their knowledge through computer usage through things like online classes, digital databases, or other learning resources. A study done by Shaheen Majid at the International Islamic University Malaysia found that there is direct relationship between people's highest level of education and their use of online learning resources. The higher an individual had gotten in their schooling, the more likely they were to use these resources to further their education. This results in citizens who are more familiar with computers increasing their computer use, and those unfamiliar with computers being less able to increase their computer skills, serving to widen the digital divide rather than leave it unaffected or reduce it.

There are various plans and initiatives in place to make computer literacy and computer training workshops available to less computer educated members of Malaysian society; notably, the government initiative Vision 2020, which aims to have all members of Malaysian society familiar with Information and Communications Technology (ICT) by the year 2020. There have also been smaller programs such as the Eighth Malaysian Plan in 2001 which collaborated with village committees to begin a nationwide computer literacy program for rural areas. This program established various locations where Malaysian citizens who otherwise would not have access to computers could be introduced to computers.

== Working to mend the digital divide in Malaysia ==
There are metaphorical roadblocks in reaching those who do not have access to internet or communication within Malaysia. Despite this, Malaysian government has been working for years to incorporate more Telecentres, general broadband accessibility, and the role of technology within schools.

Telecentres work as hubs of information and serve a vital role in the task of improving connectivity in Malaysia. A Telecentre may provide more than just access to the internet; Telecentres also provide education on how to utilize ICT, exposure to new technologies, and helps to connect urban and rural areas. Malaysian officials have recognized the importance and impact of Telecentres and have implemented at least 2,150 of the technology-rich centers throughout Malaysia.

Broadband accessibility and penetration is another focus within the issue. The average percentage of a community with broadband access sits at a relatively low 67.2%.This percentage fluctuates greatly when looking at highly populated, urban areas (such as Kuala Lumpur at 115.7%) or at scarcely populated, rural areas (Sabah boasts a measly 52.8% broadband penetration rate). In 2009, a High Speed Broadband Project was introduced to improve broadband reach, and speeds, within Malaysia. At that time, the broadband penetration rate was under 50% across the country and the project's goal was to raise the broadband penetration rate to above that. As seen above, with the current broadband penetration rate at 52.8%, the project did reach its goal.

Official organizations have also placed an emphasis on incorporating technology into schools in Malaysia, particularly because most Malaysian schools are found in rural areas. Malaysia presents one of the highest literacy rates in the world, but still faces a shortage of technological access within schools. Programs such as The Mobile Internet Unit (MIU), which provides internet access and ICT education to various schools that it visits, are focusing on introducing school children to the power, role, and workings of ICT so that they are better prepared to assist in bringing ICT to Malaysia in the future.
