= Multipurpose community telecenters =

Multipurpose Community Telecenters are telecentre facilities, which provide public access to a variety of communication and information services, such as libraries and seminar rooms. They are promoted by many governments and organisations including the International Telecommunication Union. They are generally introduced to try to bring access to information and communication technologies in rural communities, but often find significant obstacles in the high cost of connectivity, low digital literacy in the community and high maintenance costs, and are thus forced to shut down. Out of 23 of the MCT's built in rural Mexico, only 5 were working 2 years later.
