= Rebecca Masisak =

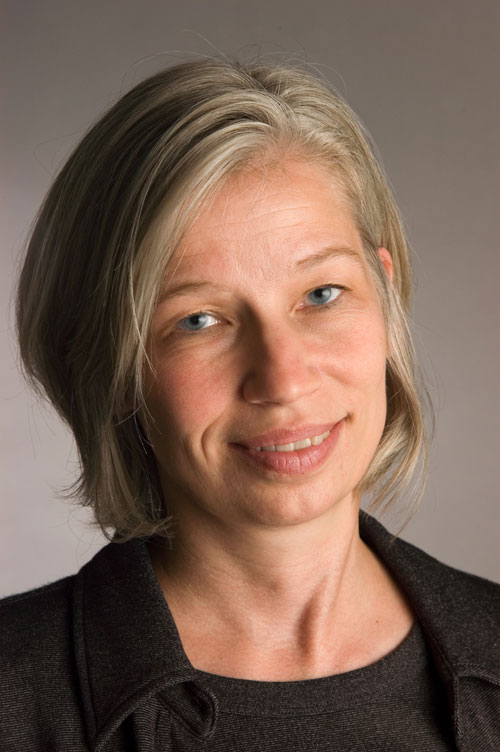
- Occupation: Technology activist
- Title: CEO of TechSoup Global

Rebecca Masisak (born 1957) is the CEO of TechSoup, a nonprofit organization that provides technical assistance to other nonprofits. She joined TechSoup (formerly CompuMentor) in 2001 and after various positions in management has served in the CEO role since 2012. Masisak established TechSoup's Europe office in Warsaw, Poland in 2009, and has overseen the organization's growth since then.

== Background and early career ==
Masisak graduated from Bethel Park High School in Pennsylvania in 1975. She subsequently studied for an MBA degree at Columbia Business School.

Starting in the early 1990s, Masisak worked as a management consultant with Coopers & Lybrand for nine years. She established an Internet service provider and served as its Senior Vice President.

== CompuMentor/TechSoup ==
Compumentor, now known as TechSoup, first hired Masisak in 2001.

Masisak led the establishment of TechSoup Europe, which is organized by Fundacja TechSoup in Warsaw. In 2010 Masisak was involved in TechSoup’s combination with Guidestar International, and the following year, the Telecentre.org Foundation Board of Trustees appointed Masisak as a member of its board.

In 2008, Masisak was featured in an article for The New York Times, "When Tech Innovation Has a Social Mission". In 2015 she was interviewed by the Financial Times about the evolving role of social media in fundraising.

In May 2017, Masisak was named one of year’s most influential women in San Francisco Bay Area business by the San Francisco Business Times. In August 2017, she was named to the Nonprofit Times’ annual list of the 50 most influential leaders in the U.S. Nonprofit sector.

== See also ==
- Nonprofit technology
- NTEN
- NTAP
