= Family Computing =

1980s computer magazine

- Volume no. 1, Issue no. 1, September 1983
- Editor-in-chief: Claudia Cohl
- Frequency: Monthly
- Circulation: 420,000 (August 1986)
- Publisher: Scholastic
- First issue: September 1983
- Final issue: April 2001
- Country: United States
- Based in: New York City
- Language: English
- Website: www.destinationsoho.com (Historical) Archived October 17, 2000, at the Wayback Machine
- ISSN: 0899-7373

Family Computing (later Family & Home Office Computing and Home Office Computing) was an American computer magazine published by Scholastic from the 1980s to the early 2000s. It covered all the major home computer platforms of the day including the Apple II, VIC-20, Commodore 64, Atari 8-bit computers, as well as the IBM PC and Macintosh. It printed a mixture of product reviews, how-to articles and type-in programs. The magazine also featured a teen-oriented insert called K-Power, written by Stuyvesant High School students called the Special-K's. The section was named after a former sister magazine which folded after a short run. This section was discontinued after the July 1987 issue as part of the magazine's shift toward home-office computing.

== History and profile ==
The first issue of the magazine appeared in September 1983. It was notable in the early days for the wide variety of systems it supported with type-in programs, including such "orphaned" systems as the Coleco Adam and TI 99/4A long after other magazines discontinued coverage. There was also a spinoff TV show on Lifetime hosted by Larry Sturholm, of which at least 26 episodes were produced.

Another section of the magazine was contributed by Joey Latimer and dealt with music related themes. This mostly amounted to BASIC program listings that would play some sort of tune on the computer platforms covered by the magazine.

After the video game crash of 1983 the magazine began to change its focus toward the burgeoning home office movement of the late 1980s and early 1990s, initiating coverage of non-computing products such as fax machines and office furniture. Article topics began to include ideas for starting a home-based business and time management tips. The title was changed, first to Family & Home Office Computing and finally to just Home Office Computing with ever-diminishing coverage of family computing topics.

In January 1998, Scholastic sold the title to Freedom Technology Media Group, which published the magazine until the April 2001 issue.
