= Citilab =

Spanish digital lab

Coordinates: 41°21′36″N 2°03′43″E

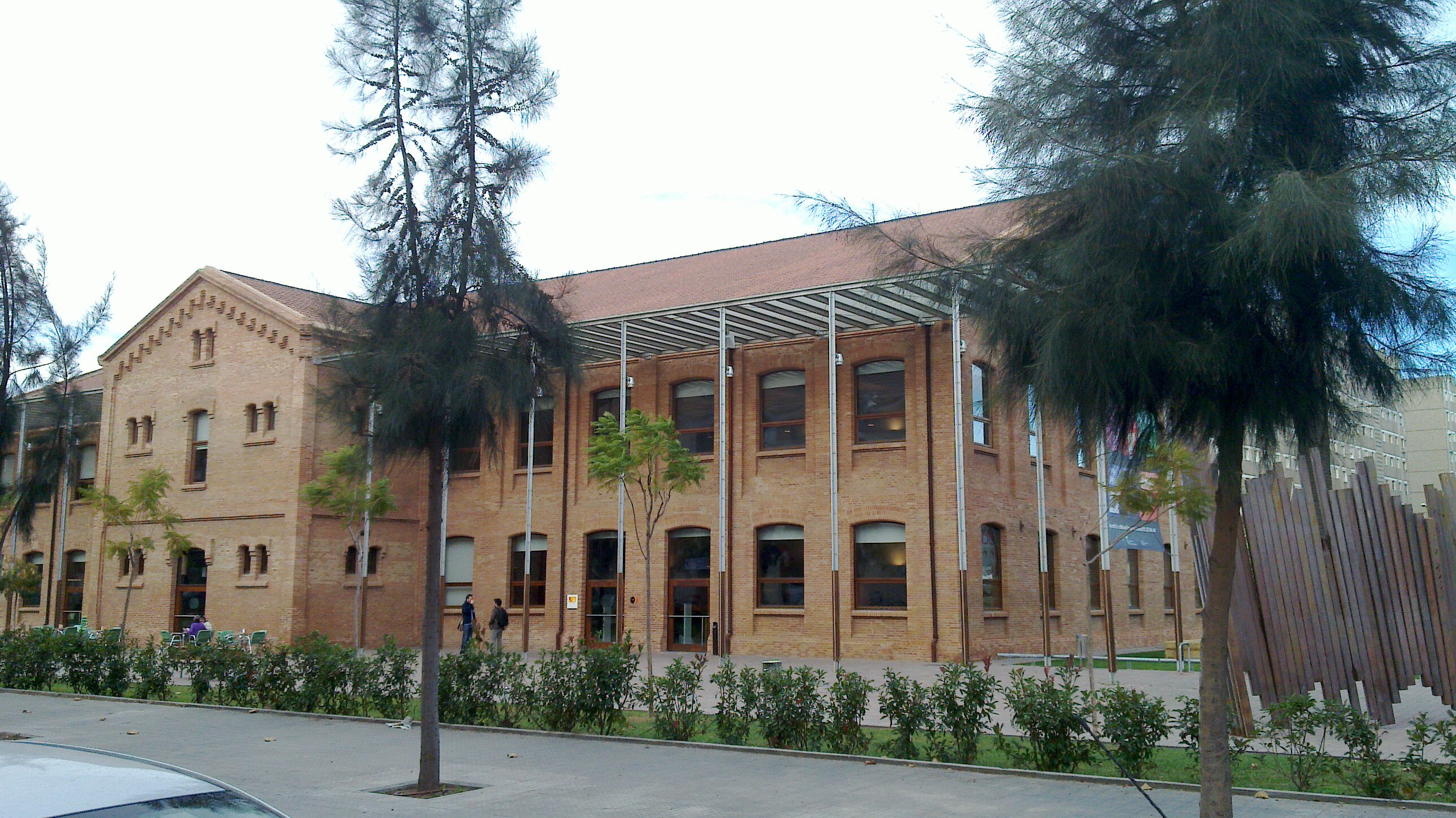
Citilab at Cornellà de Llobregat

Citilab is a digital lab for citizen innovation in Cornellà de Llobregat, Catalonia, Spain. It mixes citizen based innovation with research, entrepreneurship and training. Its rationale is to offer a resource platform for citizens so that they can start their own projects around technology and the internet, specially the collaborative and audiovisual internet.

== Origins ==
The original project was backed by the City Hall in Cornella, a town close to Barcelona, Spain. It is located in a former textile factory. After four years of restoration in November 2007 the former factory of Can Suris Cornellà de Llobregat became the headquarters of Citilab.

== Description ==
Citilab is related to the model of Living Lab, a mixed public/private partnership where citizens, businesses, government agencies and research centers are involved in the innovation process. Unlike facilities for conventional research, the Living Labs aim to create and validate technologies, products, services and business models in real settings for and everyday contexts.
