= Andy Carvin =

American journalist (born 1971)

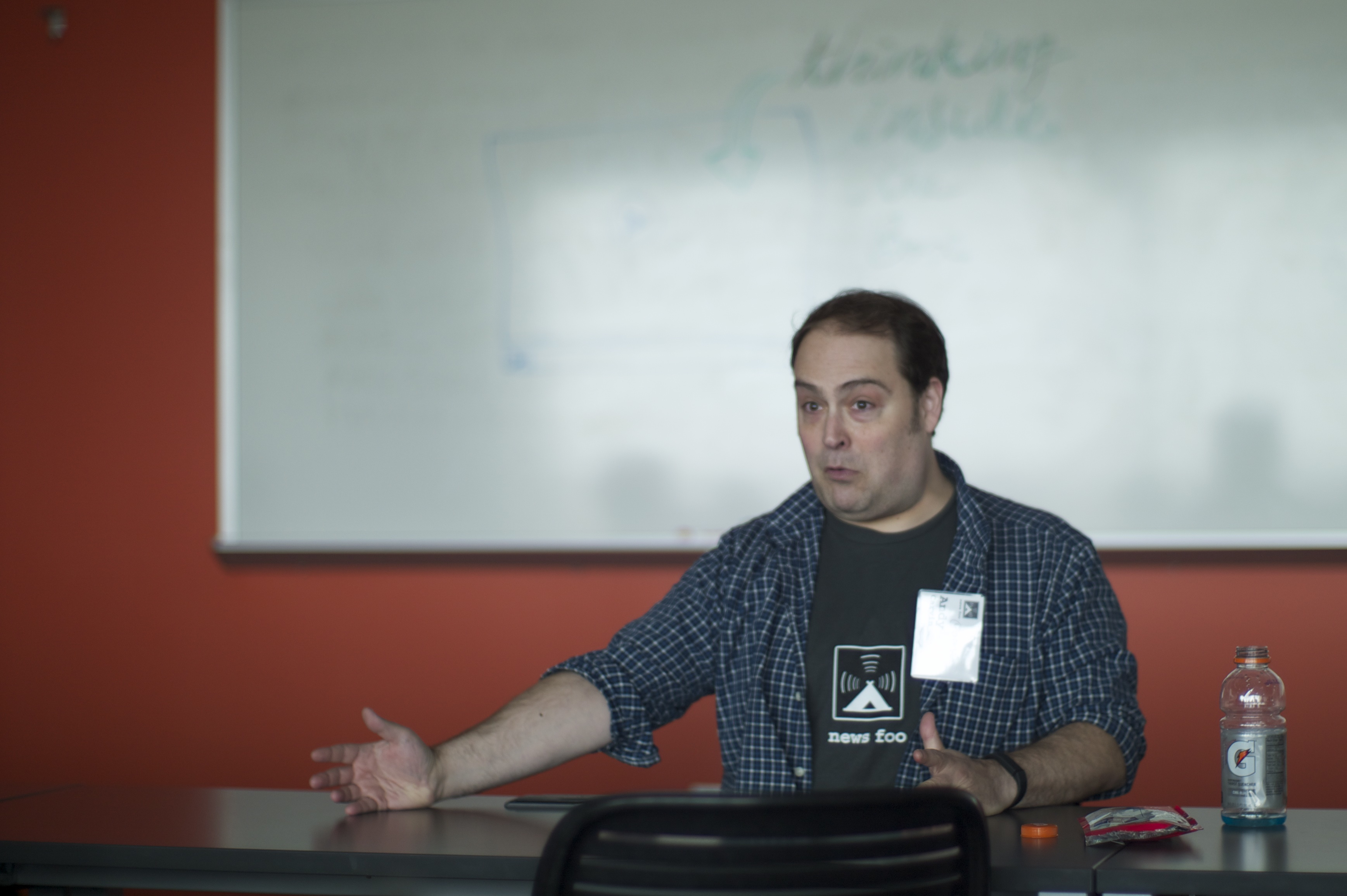
- Carvin in 2013
- Born: Andrew Wayne Carvin c. 1971 (age 54–55); Boston, Massachusetts, U.S.
- Education: Northwestern University
- Notable work: Digital Divide Network
- Website: web.archive.org/web/20100819092442/http://www.andycarvin.com/

Andy Carvin is an American blogger and a former senior product manager for online communities at National Public Radio (NPR). Carvin was the founding editor and former coordinator of the Digital Divide Network. He is now senior fellow and managing editor for the Atlantic Council's Digital Forensic Research Lab.

== Early life and education ==
Carvin was born in Boston and raised in Indialantic, Florida alongside his older brother. His parents both worked for the Harris Corporation: father worked as a systems engineer, while his mother worked as a manager. He graduated from Melbourne High School in 1989, and from Northwestern University in 1993.

== Career ==
When he was working for the Corporation for Public Broadcasting in 1994, he authored the website EdWeb, one of the first websites to advocate the use of the World Wide Web in education.

In 1999, he was hired by the Benton Foundation to help develop Helping.org, a philanthropic website that eventually became known as Networkforgood.org. At the December 1999 US National Digital Divide Summit in Washington DC, President Bill Clinton announced the launch of the Digital Divide Network, a spin-off of Helping.org edited by Carvin.

In 2001, he organized an email forum called SEPT11INFO, an emergency discussion forum in response to the September 11 attacks. Following the Boxing Day tsunami in 2004, he created the RSS aggregator Tsunami-Info.org, and served as a contributor to the TsunamiHelp collaborative blog. He also joined Global Voices Online at the end of 2004.

In January 2005, Carvin began advocating mobile phone podcasting as a tool for citizen journalism and human rights monitoring; he called the concept "mobcasting". Utilizing free online tools including FeedBurner, Blogger and Audioblogger, Carvin demonstrated the potential of mobcasting at a February 2005 Harvard blogging conference and at The Gates, the Central Park art installation created by the artist Christo. He later demonstrated mobcasting as part of a collaborative blog called Katrina Aftermath, which allowed members of the public to post multimedia content regarding Hurricane Katrina.

In May 2006, Carvin began serving as host on a blog called Learning.now on PBS, which explored "how new technology and Internet culture affect how educators teach and children learn". In September 2006, Andy Carvin became a staff member at NPR as their senior product manager for online communities. He founded NPR's social media desk in 2008, and stayed with the organization until 2013.

Carvin accepted a position at First Look Media in February 2014. He also launched Reported.ly, an initiative that focused on reporting on issues related to social justice and human rights. He later worked at NowThis and the UBC Graduate School of Journalism in Vancouver.

In 2019, Carvin was named a senior fellow to the Atlantic Council's Digital Forensic Research Lab, which investigates online misinformation.

=== Twitter journalism ===
In late 2010, Carvin began sharing information about the popular revolution in Tunisia on Twitter, curating Twitter feeds and articles for an English-speaking audience. Carvin had traveled extensively in Tunisia, had many contacts there, and was able to develop others.

In March 2011, Andy Carvin and his Twitter followers used crowdsourced research to debunk false stories that Israeli weapons were being used against the people of Libya.

By April 2011, The Columbia Journalism Review dubbed Carvin a "living, breathing real-time verification system" and suggested his might be the best Twitter account to follow in the world. The Washington Post called him "a one-man Twitter news bureau".

A few days before a foreign policy speech on the Middle East by President Barack Obama in mid-May 2011, the White House contacted Carvin and asked for him to co-host a Twitter interview chat with a White House official. Although NPR had refused to allow the White House to specify particular reporters in the past, Mark Stencel, NPR's managing editor for digital news, granted the request, saying that Carvin was "uniquely suited" for the role.

In late June 2011, Carvin traveled to Egypt, where he covered protests in Tahrir Square in Cairo.

On August 21, 2011, as armed fighters rolled into the city of Tripoli, Libya, in a bid to oust Muammar Gaddafi from his 42-year rule of the country, cable news stations in the U.S. appeared unprepared to cover the breaking news event, but Carvin tweeted over 800 times, "recording the oral history in real time". He was profiled in Britain's The Guardian newspaper as "the man who tweets revolutions".

Carvin donated the iPhone he used to tweet during the Arab Spring to the American History Museum.

== Awards and nominations ==
For Carvin's work on mobcasting and the digital divide, he received a 2005 TR35 award from Technology Review, awarded annually to the 35 leading technology innovators under the age of 35. Carvin has also been honored as one of the top education technology advocates in eSchool News magazine and District Administration magazine.

In July 2011, Carvin received the Journalism Awards: Special Distinction Award, Knight-Batten Award for Innovation for his Twitter reporting.

The Daily Dot recognized Carvin as second only to online hacktivist group Anonymous in his influence on Twitter in the year 2011. In its writeup of Carvin, the Dot compared him to Edward R. Murrow, whose radio coverage of the London Blitz established him as a household name in the United States during World War II.

In 2011 and 2012, Carvin's Twitter feed was included on Time Magazine's list of the year's 140 Best Twitter Feeds.

== Writing ==
In 2013, Carvin published Distant Witness, a book covering his journalistic coverings of the Arab Spring.

Carvin has written for The Atlantic and Politico.

== Personal life ==
Carvin lives in Silver Spring, Maryland with his wife and two children.
