= Western Australian Community Resource Centres =

Centres in Western Australia

Western Australian Community Resource Centres are government funded centres in Western Australia.

In the 1990s the Western Australian Government created funding for community centres in Western Australia. The system was boosted in the 2000s by funding from the Royalties for Regions programme.

In most cases they were successors to earlier telecentres around the state. Some community recreation centres have published newsletters.
