= Asia-Pacific Telecentre Network =

- Company type: Nonprofit
- Website type: Regional community
- Available in: English
- Headquarters: Colombo, Sri Lanka
- Website: www.aptn.asia
- Commercial: No
- Registration: Optional
- Launched: 19 November 2008; 17 years ago
- Current status: Strengthening in-progress

The Asia-Pacific Telecentre Network (APTN) is a collaborative initiative of the United Nations Economic and Social Commission for Asia and the Pacific (UN-ESCAP) and telecentre.org. The APTN Secretariat is hosted at ICT Agency of Sri Lanka (ICTA). APTN is dedicated to promote innovation and knowledge sharing amongst telecentres in the Asia-Pacific region where telecentres are growing exponentially each year. APTN is working towards creating a platform of networks of telecentres, to share experiences on issues of their interest (content, sustainability, connectivity, etc.) and to cooperate on the development of solutions for common problems of the telecentres themselves in order to empower poor and disadvantaged communities with information and communication technology (ICT) in the Asia-Pacific region. In other words, APTN will serve as the focal network or the knowledge hub for communication and information technology in the Asia Pacific region.

== History ==
The World Summit on the Information Society (2003 and 2005) and the World Summit for Sustainable Development (2002) recognized the importance of the ICT in narrowing the digital divide and attaining sustainable development, respectively. In view of the above, many countries established community access points with the intention of providing common access to ICT related services to rural communities. However, it has now been realized that community access points established to narrow the digital divide has not been able to capture the fragmented and underutilized knowledge of the poor and the disadvantaged communities. While many reasons could be attributed to this situation some of the significant causes are; inadequate exchange of experience related to ICT, weak linkages with stakeholders and low capacity of disadvantage communities in accessing and utilization of knowledge.

The project entitled "Knowledge networks through ICT access points for disadvantage communities", which is being implemented by UNESCAP, attempts to empower poor and the disadvantaged communities through transformation of selected ICT access points into knowledge hubs of global knowledge networks by providing, developing, organizing, sharing and disseminating knowledge demanded by these communities. In the process, the project anticipated achieving; establishment of global/ regional knowledge network(s) for community development, enriched value proposition of ICT access points through their transformation into knowledge hubs and increase engagement of poor and the disadvantaged in the transformation process.

Since the inception of the project in 2006, number of activities has been accomplished to achieve the primary objective of the project. While the two regional meetings shared experience on telecentre operations and consulted telecentre operators on possible establishment of networks, subsequently APTN was established.

The Asia-Pacific Telecentre Network (APTN) was launched at the United Nations Conference Center in Bangkok on 19 November 2008, during an event attended by high level officials from 16 countries of the Asia-Pacific region, representatives from several United Nations bodies and other organisations. It was a collaborative initiative of UNESCAP together with 18 founding members from 10 countries in the region and support of partners such as the International Development Research Centre (IDRC) and telecentre.org.

== Secretariat ==
Information and Communication Technology Agency of Sri Lanka (ICTA) hosted the APTN Secretariat in Sri Lanka. On 7 February 2009, APTN Secretariat was set up by Secretary to the President of Sri Lanka and Chairman of UN-ESCAP's Committee on Information and Communication Technology, Lalith Weeratunga. While setting up the APTN Secretariat in Sri Lanka, Lalith Weeratunga gave an insight into the benefits of the Secretariat being hosted by Sri Lanka,

"I... being delighted that Sri Lanka has been selected to host the Secretariat of the Asia Pacific Telecentre Network and being aware that by hosting the Secretariat Sri Lanka can benefit as well as perform a pivotal role in making world community benefit from innovation and knowledge-sharing amongst telecentre organisations in the Asia-Pacific region..."

== Objectives of the network ==
The APTN was set up with two main objectives. First it is intended to empower the poor and disadvantaged communities through the transformation of existing ICT access points in selected counties around the worlds into knowledge hubs of regional/ global knowledge networks. The second expected accomplishment is specifically concerned with transforming ICT access centres from conventional access centres into smart knowledge hubs. Transforming an ICT access point into a knowledge hub, involves revitalization of ICT access points, developing new functions, connecting them with the global networks, and activating partnerships. By becoming knowledge hubs, it is expected that the access centres will further have a positive impact on the development of local communities. Therefore, the APTN, which is established as a voluntary mechanism of networks of telecentres operating in countries in the Asia-Pacific region, has the objective to promote the interest of the telecentre movement throughout the region, and to strengthen the capacity of telecentres to provide, develop, organize, share and disseminate knowledge for the sustainable development of marginalized communities.

Further, the network aims at synergizing the various initiatives being carried out by various institutions. There are several modalities which APTN would develop in its future endeavors such as,

- Advocacy – providing a forum for identifying common issues and views, and promoting sustainable telecentres.
- Training – sharing experiences, skills and expertise, identifying new or re-usable solutions for common problems, sharing researches on telecentre implementation – lessons learnt and best practices, and sharing knowledge on methodologies and tools used for telecentre assessment and evaluation.
- Collective action – producing products collaboratively and pooling resources and creating synergies.

== Role ==
The main intention of setting up APTN is to promote innovation and knowledge-sharing amongst telecentre organizations in the Asia-Pacific region where telecentres are growing each year. In achieving its target, the role of the APTN was modified and developed through several activities which were followed by its initiative taken place in November, 2008. During the regional workshop on Knowledge hubs in Asia Pacific Region, held in Nanjing, China on 8–10 September 2009, it discussed the benefits that APTN can provide to information and knowledge sharing, sustainability, best practices and resource mobilization for effective knowledge hubs/ networks. Also during the workshop for "Regional Workshop for Knowledge hubs and Networks in Asia Pacific Region – Next Step" held in Bangkok, Thailand on 10–11 December 2009, it further upgraded the role allocated to APTN as follows:

Prioritized activities of the below list will be allocated for action in the year 2010.

- Develop APTN website/portal – Act as a repository of knowledge derived from the Asia-Pacific and other regions including accurate and updated database, tools and directories of resources for the benefit of national networks.
1. Work towards knowledge sharing and knowledge fusion of best practices and unsuccessful practices with a pro-active approach.
2. Play a crucial role in facilitating knowledge sharing, transfer and analysis.
3. Facilitate periodic online chats and discussion lists with the help of anchors from national networks and experts
4. Manage a website based on participatory design to help develop collaborative learning and content development with coordination with telecenter.org and other regional networks.
5. Knowledge synthesis becomes key vis-à-vis simple knowledge sharing with strong linkages with the Telecentre Magazine.
- Consultancy assistance – Facilitating consultancy work in Asia Pacific, or creating a database/ pool of experts in various areas that will be useful for national networks/operators and knowledge hubs.
- Funding assistance – Work with national networks to identify specific projects for donor funding in multi-country partnership. Accessing potential donors jointly with member networks for greater credibility.
- Event coordination – Coordinating events in partnership with eAsia or other larger events.
- Resource mobilization – Working together towards a common goal.
- Enabling policy – Assisting governments to implement the telecentre component in eGovernment programmes, and including telecentres in providing government services to citizens in the rural areas.
- Taking a proactive approach to telecentre development.
- Facilitate knowledge exchange between national telecentre networks.
- Facilitate study tours among networks.
- Organize awareness raising campaigns including promotion of telecentres and knowledge hubs
- Analyze business plans of the member of the network – Business plans to include revenue generation models, assessing strengths and weaknesses of the particular network. It was agreed that national stakeholders would drive the process while the regional networks would add value through bringing best practices from different regions
- Play a catalytic role in developing partnerships with countries which do not have national networks of telecentres
- Develop criteria for membership of regional networks and also develop modalities for working relationships with national focal points.

== Activities of the secretariat ==
Taking its first step to the APTN activities, APTN Secretariat has created a web portal (a-ptnetwork.ning.com) for the purpose of knowledge sharing among its member networks.

Further, APTN has co-organized a workshop on resource mobilization for telecentre organizations in Asia-Pacific on 1 December 2009 in Colombo, Sri Lanka. "The Resource Mobilization Workshop for Telecentre Networks in Asia" was jointly organized by the International Development Research Centre (IDRC) and the APTN. The workshop was successfully conducted, which was participated in by network leaders, telecentre knowledge workers and stakeholders from all over Asia. The whole day program consisted of three innovative segments which were organized and titled as 'Telecentre Idol Competition', 'Telecentre Open Clinic', and 'Telecentre Talk Show'.

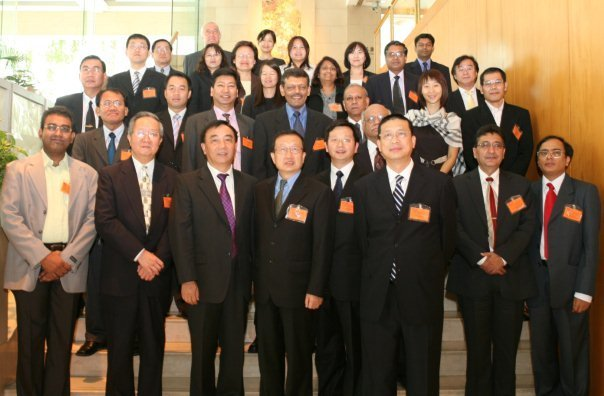
Participants of the Regional Workshop for Knowledge Hub in Asia Pacific Region: held in 8–10 September 2009, Nanjing, China.

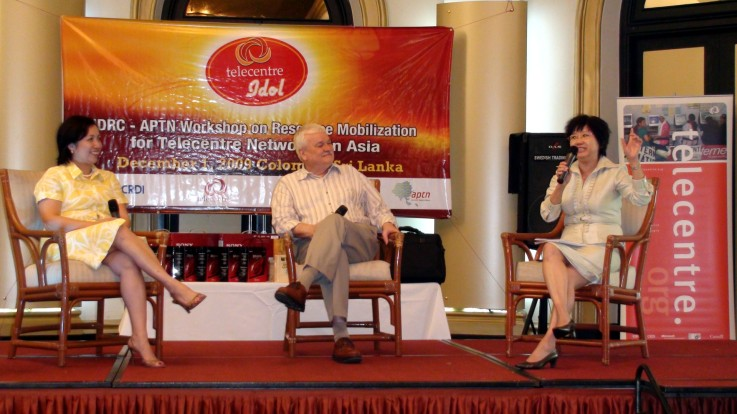
Telecentre Talk Show at Resource Mobilization Workshop: held on 1 December 2009, Colombo Sri Lanka

=== Web portal ===
Initially APTN web portal was hosted on Ning. As Ning announced that they remove all free networks, APTN Secretariat moved the APTN web portal to another platform, Grou.ps. APTN web portal is now available at www.aptn.asia.

Screenshot of APTN's old web portal

Screenshot of APTN's new web portal

== Plans: strengthening national telecentre networks ==
With the recommendations and agreements made during the "Regional Workshop for Knowledge hubs and Networks in Asia Pacific Region – Next Step" held in Bangkok, Thailand on 10–11 December 2009, APTN is in the process of developing its initial work plan for the first half of 2010.

APTN intends to play a vital role among the existing ICT access points/telecentres and networks as knowledge hubs to empower the poor and disadvantaged as these access points and networks provide knowledge or services to the needs of communities they serve. During the meeting in Bangkok, Thailand, it was reiterated that these access points or centres and networks were the direct means to reach marginalized and poor communities due to their proximity to the people and the areas that they serve. The Participants were of the view that easy access to these access points/ centres and affordable services, programmes specifically tailored to the poor and marginalized groups make them more effective and sustainable. Therefore, APTN is expecting to come up with special projects where it can address and empower the poor and marginalized societies with the benefits of ICT.

Further APTN hopes to work with ICT access points/ networks which it can reach and bring opportunities for women to become entrepreneurs as well as catalysts for development and also the leadership role in the local community. In many countries in the Asia pacific region, women's associations had been using ICT access points/ networks as meeting places, training centres and tools to reach other women towards raising awareness in large spectrum of issues, such as, health, education, social issues, disaster preparedness, economic activities, among others.

As recommended from a Bangkok, Thailand workshop, APTN will take steps to undertake the below mentioned activities with the intention of providing a better ICT services through the knowledge hubs and networks to empower the diverse communities in Asia Pacific region:

- Establishing a telecentrepedia
- To collaborate with the "telecenter.org" foundation and others to define its telecentre contents
- Contribute ideas for the book of '100 ideas for sustainable telecentres' and proposed creation of "telecentre magazine" to be released by March 2010 in Manila, Philippines.
- To work on 'Asia Pacific Telecentre Review' (APTR)
- Publishing a 'telecentre best practices book'.
- Using the available resources like, the telecentre academy, and material developed in countries like the Philippines for capacity building of telecentre operators and users
- Working on on-line and off-line training and the need to localize training materials to suit country specific conditions and environment

== See also ==
- Asia-Pacific
- Telecentre
- United Nations Economic and Social Commission for Asia and the Pacific
