= Marilyne Andersen =

Swiss building physicist

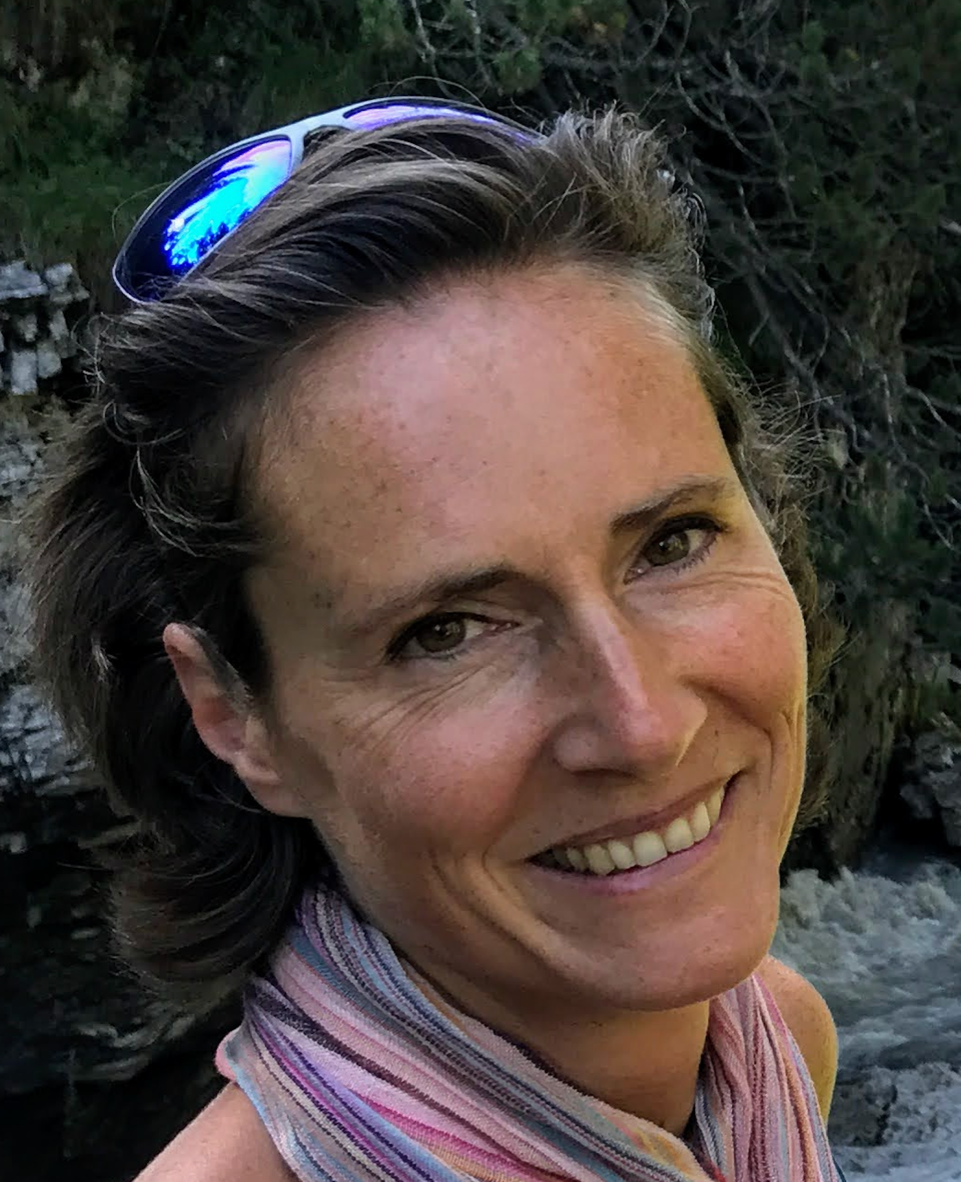
Marilyne Andersen

Marilyne Andersen is a Full Professor of Sustainable Construction Technologies and former Dean of the School of Architecture, Civil and Environmental Engineering of EPFL. She is heading the Laboratory of Integrated Performance in Design that she launched in 2010. Before joining EPFL as a faculty, she was an associate professor in the Building Technology Group of MIT’s School of Architecture and Planning and the head of the MIT Daylighting Lab that she founded in 2004.

Andersen has a Master of Science degree in physics and specialized in daylighting through her PhD in building physics at EPFL in the Solar Energy and Building Physics Laboratory (LESO) and as a visiting scholar in the Building Technologies Department of the Lawrence Berkeley National Laboratory in California.

== Research and career ==
Andersen's research focuses on building performance in the architectural context in general, and the use and optimization of daylight in buildings in particular. Specific topics she has been working on include: visual and thermal comfort; design tools in the early stages of the design process; goal-driven approaches in design; performance visualization; design implications of effects of light on circadian photoreception and health; advanced glazing and shading systems, daylight redirecting devices; video-based approaches in photometry.

Andersen has been teaching daylighting and building technology and has been involved in workshops, studios or classes related to these fields. As part of her non-institutional activities, she has been hired as a daylighting consultant for design projects for housing, campus buildings and mid-rise office buildings and as an expert for a patent infringement case. She is an active member of several Illuminating Engineering Society (IES) and International Commission on Illumination (CIE) committees.

Marilyne Andersen was the inaugural laureate of The Daylight Award for Research in 2016 and served as a jury member for this award in 2018 (as chair), in 2020 and in 2022.

== Published papers ==
Andersen is the author of more than 90 papers published in peer-reviewed journals and international conferences and the recipient of several grants and awards including: three best conference paper awards (2011 & 2012), the Taylor Technical Talent Award granted by the Illuminating Engineering Society (2009), the 3M Non-Tenured Faculty Grant (2009), the Mitsui Career Development Professorship at MIT (2008), and the EPFL prize of the Chorafas Foundation awarded to her PhD thesis in Sustainability (2005). Her research or teaching has been supported by professional, institutional and industrial organizations such as: the Swiss and the U.S. National Science Foundations, the Velux Foundation, the Boston Society of Architects, the Swiss Energy and Mobility Competence Center, the MIT Energy Initiative, 3M and Saint Gobain SA.
