= Telecottage =

Telecottage is usually a community based facility that is there to assist learning, access to technology, access to work etc. for its local community.

The Telecottages movement started in Sweden and the idea has been taken up quite widely, notably in the United Kingdom where at the last count (in 1997) there were some 200 telecottages. In France, there are many telecenters, cybercenters and cyberplatforms, some of which, as in the Berry region, are called telecottage; they are constituted as a social and development project in rural areas, associating a convivial place, work, training and service spaces (including a job search point and a daycare center), while having a commercial vocation ("offer of services - fax, e-mail, computers, telecommuting, training)".

== See also ==
- Digital divide
- Digital inclusion
- NetDay
- Telecentre
