= Circuit rider (technology) =

Technology assistance organization for non-profits

The term circuit rider, which has its roots in Methodist preaching, has more recently been applied to technology assistance providers who travel to small non-profit organizations in a particular sector to troubleshoot or support particular technology needs in those organizations. Another term for these people is eRider.

In this context, a circuit rider is part trainer, part management consultant, and part computer expert. They provide consulting and assistance with technology strategy development, make multiple visits to the organizations they serve, and provide advice and information by phone and e-mail. They can serve regional constituencies by travel from a central location. Additionally, circuit riders can "cross-pollinate" the groups they service, transmitting insights, tools, and tips as they travel throughout the sector. In addition, training materials and resources can be used at multiple sites, thereby spreading the development cost out across a number of organizations.

The umbrella term for this field is nonprofit technology, and circuit riders are a form of nonprofit technology assistance provider.

== History ==
Modern technology circuit riding for nonprofits began in the U.S. in the mid-1990s, when Gavin Clabaugh at the Telecommunications Cooperative Network approached the W. Alton Jones Foundation to get funding for technology services for a group of the foundation's grantees. The making of a request directly from a service provider to a funding source (the foundation) to serve a group of grantees was a novel approach for technology provision in the nonprofit sector. To differentiate the approach, it was given the name circuit riding.

The community of circuit riders that eventually formed across the American nonprofit technology frontier was initiated by Rob Stuart while working at the Rockefeller Family Fund.

== See also ==
- Community informatics
- Community organizing
- Nonprofit technology assistance provider
