= Community informatics =

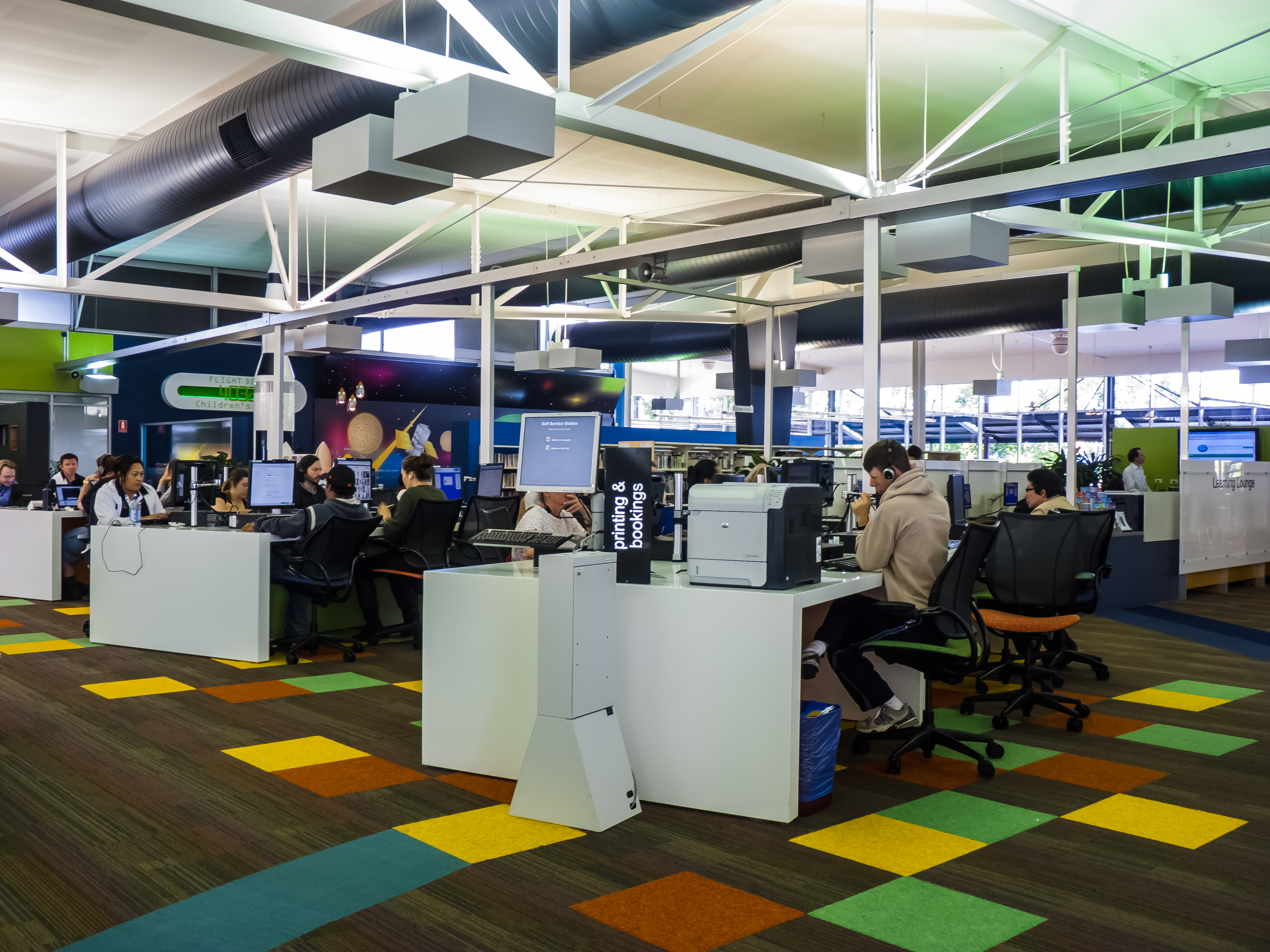
Community computers at the Chermside Library in Brisbane, Australia.

Community informatics (CI) is an interdisciplinary field that is concerned with using information and communication technology (ICT) to empower members of communities and support their social, cultural, and economic development. Community informatics may contribute to enhancing democracy, supporting the development of social capital, and building well connected communities; moreover, it is probable that such similar actions may let people experience new positive social change. In community informatics, there are several considerations which are the social context, shared values, distinct processes that are taken by members in a community, and social and technical systems. It is formally located as an academic discipline within a variety of academic faculties including information science, information systems, computer science, planning, development studies, and library science among others and draws on insights on community development from a range of backgrounds and disciplines. It is an interdisciplinary approach interested in using ICTs for different forms of community action, as distinct from pure academic study of ICT effects.

== Background ==
Most humans live in communities. In some urban areas, community and neighborhood are conflated but this may be a limited definition. Communities are defined as people coming together in pursuit of common aims or shared practices through any means, including physical, electronic, and social networks. They proliferate even while the ability to define them is amorphous.

Cultures ensure their growth and survival by continuing the norms and mores that are the bases of their way of life. Communities can use the infrastructure of ICTs as a method of continuing cultures within the context of the Internet and the World Wide Web. Once a cultural identity is defined within the context of these technologies, it can be replicated and disseminated through various means, including the sharing of information through websites, applications, databases, and file sharing. In this manner, a group that defines its cultural identity within the construct of technology infrastructure is empowered to hold valuable exchanges within the spheres of economics, political power, high and popular culture, education, and entertainment.

Since the inception of the Internet and the World Wide Web, we have seen the exponential growth of enterprises ranging from electronic commerce, social networking, entertainment and education, as well as a myriad of other contrivances and file exchanges that allow for an ongoing cultural enrichment through technology. However, there has been a general lag as to which populations can benefit through these services due to impediments such as geographic location, a lack of funds, gaps in technology and the expertise and skills that are required to operate these systems.

To date there has been very considerable investment in supporting the electronic development of business communities, one-to-many social tools (for example, corporate intranets, or purpose-built exchange and social networking services such as eBay, or Myspace), or in developing applications for individual use. There is far less understanding, or investment in human-technical networks and processes that are intended to deliberately result in social change or community change, particularly in communities for whom electronic communication is secondary to having an adequate income or social survival.

The communal dimension (and focus of Community Informatics) results in a strong interest in studying and developing strategies for how ICTs can enable and empower those living in physical communities. This is particularly the case in those communities where ICT access is done communally, through Telecentres, information kiosks, community multimedia centres, and other technologies. This latter set of approaches has become of very considerable interest as Information and Communications Technology for Development (ICT4D) has emerged as a significant element in strategic (and funding) approaches to social and economic development in Less Developed Countries. ICT4D initiatives have been undertaken by public, NGO and private sector agencies concerned with development such as the United Nations Development Program, the World Bank, the Swiss Agency for Development and Cooperation (SDC), the MS Swaminathan Research Foundation; have emerged as a key element in the poverty alleviation component of the UN's Millennium Development Goals; and as important directions for private sector investment both from a market perspective (cf. the "Bottom of the Pyramid") and from companies concerned with finding a delivery channel for goods and services into rural and low income communities.

While the progress of ICT4D has been remarkably fast in general as communities become more information-based, the digital divide appears to be a great challenge to its proponents. Although access to information technology in North America and Europe is high, it is the complete opposite in other regions of the world, particularly in Africa and in some parts of Asia. For instance, in the ASEAN region alone, there are countries who are leaders in digital technology such as Singapore, Malaysia, and Thailand while on the other side of the pole are countries who have very poor access to and development in digital technology including Cambodia, Lao PDR, Myanmar, and Vietnam. The effectiveness of ICT as a tool for development is highly contingent on the capacity of all countries to accommodate and maintain information and communications technology.

There is thus growing interest in Community Informatics as an approach to understanding how different ICTs can enable and empower marginalized communities to achieve their collective goals.

== Understanding communities ==
It is crucial to know how communities are formed and evolved and how the participation to a community occurs and differs while formation process. Understanding the nature of communities and the participation process will surely ensure designing and implementing a successful ICT solution that benefits members of community while communicating with each other or performing certain tasks. The following points include a brief description of the nature of each potential community formation.

=== Community as a place ===
A group of people may form a community according to the place in which they live, enjoy staying, and work. They usually participate in communities within these three places since they gather together on consistent basis so that it is highly expected that such community is formed. Beside the home and the work gathering, people usually like to spend their time at informal places called third places in where they meet their new or old friends or have a chance to meet new people.

=== Community as a socio-spatial entity ===
A group of people may form a community as they have frequent direct interactions or live in close proximity to each other. The members of such community may have strong bond and focused common goals which give them a higher status over other communities. Moreover, as the number of the members increases, the community may become reputable and has a higher status over other communities.

=== Community as links between people ===
A group of people may form a community as they have common shared identity. People may form such community to support and advocate common shared values, morals or norms in which they believe. Such a community may have a set of symbols and be associated with a status over other communities. The inclusion and the exclusion to such community depend on whether or not a member share the same identity with others in the community. For instance, people who descend from one origin may form a community in which only people from that origin can join the community even though they do not know each other in advance.

=== Community of interests ===
A group of people may form a community as they have similar affinity for a particular activity, experience, or subject. The geographical location is not necessary while forming such community, and the inclusion and the exclusion to such community depends on whether a new member has that affinity or not.

=== Communities linked to life stage ===
A group of people may form a community if they share a similar experience in a distinct life stage. The experience could be related to the members themselves or to their relatives, such as their children. For instance, parents of elementary school children may form a community in which they care about their children while in school. As it is mentioned in the previous type of community formation, the members of such community have a common interest which is caring about their children while in school. This type of community may persist over time, but the inclusion and the exclusion to it may happen consistently as people are no longer in that distinct life stage.

=== Communities of practice ===
A group of people who share a similar profession may form a community in which they work to attain their goals and advance in their profession. Three important concepts are considered while forming community of practice which are mutual engagement, joint enterprise, and shared repertoire. In a community of practice, the members have to be mutually engaged with each other by establishing collaborative relationships that will allow them to willingly work on certain joint activities. In the second concept which is joint enterprise, the members of a community of practice are supposed to discuss and agree upon the work responsibilities so that they can work in harmony, and each member knows his responsibility and his expected contributions to the community. In addition to these two concepts, the members of the community of practice have a shared repertoire of procedures or ways to perform certain tasks. They usually agree upon these procedures and practices that they establish and develop over time.

== Conceptual approaches ==
As an academic discipline, CI can be seen as a field of practice in applied information and communications technology. Community informatics is a technique for looking at economic and social development within the construct of technology—online health communities, social networking websites, cultural awareness and enhancement through online connections and networks, electronic commerce, information exchanges, as well as a myriad of other aspects that contributes to creating a personal and group identity. The term was brought to prominence by Michael Gurstein. Michael Gurstein says that community informatics is a technology strategy or discipline that connects at the community level economic and social development with the emergence of community and civic networks, electronic commerce, online participation, self-help, virtual health communities, "Tele-centres", as well as other types of online institutions and corporations. He brought out the first representative collection of academic papers, although others, such as Brian Loader and his colleagues at the University of Teesside used the term in the mid-1990s.

CI brings together the practices of community development and organization, and insights from fields such as sociology, planning, computer science, critical theory, women's studies, library and information sciences, management information systems, and management studies. Its outcomes—community networks and community-based ICT-enabled service applications—are of increasing interest to grassroots organizations, NGOs and civil society, governments, the private sector, and multilateral agencies among others. Self-organized community initiatives of all varieties, from different countries, are concerned with ways to harness ICT for social capital, poverty alleviation and for the empowerment of the "local" in relation to its larger economic, political and social environments. Some claim it is potentially a form of 'radical practice'.

Community informatics may in fact, not gel as a single field within the academy, but remain a convenient locale for interdisciplinary activity, drawing upon many fields of social practice and endeavour, as well as knowledge of community applications of technology. However, one can begin to see the emergence of a postmodern "trans-discipline" presenting a challenge to existing disciplinary "stove-pipes" from the perspectives of the rapidly evolving fields of technology practice, technology change, public policy and commercial interest. Whether or not such a "trans-discipline" can maintain its momentum remains to be seen given the incertitude about the boundaries of such disciplines as community development.

Furthermore, there is a continuing disconnect between those coming from an Information Science perspective for whom social theories, including general theories of organisation are unfamiliar or seemingly irrelevant to solving complex 'technical' problems, and those whose focus is upon the theoretical and practical issues around working with communities for democratic and social change

Given that many of those most actively involved in early efforts were academics, it is only inevitable that a process of "sense-making" with respect to these efforts would follow from "tool-making" efforts. These academics, and some community activists connected globally through the medium.

A first formal meeting of researchers with an academic interest in these initiatives was held in conjunction with the 1999 Global Community Networking Conference in Buenos Aires, Argentina. This meeting began the process of linking community-based ICT initiatives in developed countries with initiatives undertaken in developing countries, which were often part of larger economic and social development programmes funded by agencies such as the UN Development Programme, World Bank, or the International Development Research Centre. Academics and researchers interested in ICT efforts in developed countries began to see common and overlapping interests with those interested in similar work in less developed countries. For example, the issue of sustainability as a technical, cultural, and economic problem for community informatics has resulted in a special issue of the Journal of Community Informatics as well as the subject of ongoing conferences in Prato, Italy and other conferences in South Africa.

In Canada, the beginnings of CI can be recognized from various trials in community networking in the 1970s (Clement 1981). An essential development occurred in the 1990s, due to the change of cost of computers and modems. Moreover, examples of using computer networking to initiate and enhance social activities was acknowledged by women's groups (Balka 1992) and by the labor movement (Mazepa 1997).

=== Social informatics beyond an immediate concern for a community ===
Social informatics refers to the body of research and study that examines social aspects of computerization—including the roles of information technology in social and organizational change, the uses of information technologies in social contexts, and the ways that the social organization of information technologies is influenced by social forces and social practices. Historically, social informatics research has been strong in the Scandinavian countries, the UK and Northern Europe. In Europe some researchers have pointed out that in order to create awareness of the importance of social issues of computing, one has to focus on didactics of social informatics. Within North America, the field is represented largely through independent research efforts at a number of diverse institutions. Social informatics research diverges from earlier, deterministic (both social and technological) models for measuring the social impacts of technology. Such technological deterministic models characterized information technologies as tools to be installed and used with a pre-determined set of impacts on society dictated by the technology's stated capabilities. Similarly, the socially deterministic theory represented by some proponents of the social construction of technology (SCOT) or social shaping of technology theory see technology as the product of human social forces.

== Criticisms ==
There is a tension between the practice and research ends of the field. To some extent this reflects the gap, familiar from other disciplines such as community development, community organizing and community based research. In addition, the difficulty that Information Systems has in recognising the qualitative dimension of technology research means that the kind of approach taken by supporters of community informatics is difficult to justify to a positive field oriented towards solutions of technical, rather than social problems. This is a difficulty also seen in the relationship between strict technology research and management research. Problems in conceptualising and evaluating complex social interventions relying on a technical base are familiar from community health and community education. There are long-standing debates about the desire for accountable – especially quantifiable and outcome-focused social development, typically practised by government or supported by foundations, and the more participatory, qualitatively rich, process-driven priorities of grass-roots community activists, familiar from theorists such as Paulo Freire, or Deweyan pragmatism.

Some of the theoretical and practical tensions are also familiar from such disciplines as program evaluation and social policy, and perhaps paradoxically, Management Information Systems, where there is continual debate over the relative virtue and values of different forms of research and action, spread around different understandings of the virtues or otherwise of allegedly "scientific" or "value-free" activity (frequently associated with "responsible" and deterministic public policy philosophies), and contrasted with more interpretive and process driven viewpoints in bottom-up or practice driven activity. Community informatics would in fact probably benefit from closer knowledge of, and relationship to, theorists, practitioners, and evaluators of rigorous qualitative research and practice.

A further concern is the potential for practice to be "hijacked" by policy or academic agendas, rather than being driven by community goals, both in developed and developing countries. The ethics of technology intervention in indigenous or other communities has not been sufficiently explored, even though ICTs are increasingly looked upon as an important tool for social and economic development in such communities. Moreover, neither explicit theoretical positions nor ideological positioning has yet emerged. Many projects appear to have developed with no particular disciplinary affiliation, arising more directly from policy or practice imperatives to 'do something' with technology as funding opportunities arise or as those at the grassroots (or working with the grassroots) identify ICT as possible resources to respond to local issues, problems or opportunities. The papers and documented outcomes (as questions or issues for further research or elaboration) on the wiki of the October 2006 Prato conference demonstrate that many of the social, rather than technical issues are key questions of concern to any practitioner in community settings: how to bring about change; the nature of authentic or manufactured community; ethical frameworks; or the politics of community research.

A different strain of critique has emerged from gender studies. Some theorists have argued that feminist contributions to the field have yet to be fully acknowledged and Community Informatics as a research area has yet to welcome feminist interventions. This exists despite the presence of several gender-oriented studies and leadership roles played by women in community informatics initiatives.

== Research and practice interests ==
Research and practice ranges from concerns with purely virtual communities; to situations in which virtual or online communication are used to enhance existing communities in urban, rural, or remote geographic locations in developed or developing countries; to applications of ICTs for the range of areas of interest for communities including social and economic development, environmental management, media and "content" production, public management and e-governance among others. A central concern, although one not always realized in practice is with "enabling" or "empowering" communities with ICT that is, ensuring that the technology is available for the community. This further implies an approach to development which is rather more "bottom up" than "top down".

Areas of concern range from small-scale projects in particular communities or organizations which might involve only a handful of people, such as telecentres; an on online community of disabled people; civic networks and to large national, government sponsored networking projects in countries such as Australia and Canada or local community projects such as working with Maori families in New Zealand. The Gates Foundation has been active in supporting public libraries in countries such as Chile. An area of rapidly developing interest is in the use of ICT as a means to enhance citizen engagement as an "e-Governance" counterpart (or counterweight) to transaction oriented initiatives.

A key conceptual element and framing concept for Community Informatics is that of "effective use" introduced initially by Michael Gurstein in a critique of a research pre-occupation with the Digital Divide as ICT "access". CI is concerned with how ICTs are used in practice and not simply facilitating "access" to them and the notion of "effective use" is a bridge between CI research (research and analysis of the constituent elements of effective use), CI policy (developing enabling structures and programmes supportive of "effective use") and practice (implementing applications and services in support of local communities).

Another way to understand CI is Clement and Shade's "access rainbow" (Clement and Shade 2000). Clement and Shade have contended that accomplishing insignificant specialized connectedness to the Internet is no assurance that an individual or group will prevail with regards to appropriating new ICTs in ways that advance their improvement, independence, or empowerment. It is an approach which has multi-layered socio-specialized model for universal access to ICTs. It is displayed as seven layers, starting with the fundamental technical components of connectedness and moving upward through layers that inexorably push the essential social framework of access. The seven layers are:

7. Governance

6. Literacy / Social facilitation

5. Service / Access providers

4. Content / Services

3. Software tools

2. Devices

1. Carriage

Even though all elements are important, the most important one is the content /service layer in the middle, since this is where the actual utility is most direct. The upper layers focus on social dimensions and the lower layers focus on technical aspects.

Many practitioners would dispute any necessary connection to university research, regarding academic theorising and interventions as constraining or irrelevant to grassroots activity which should be beyond the control of traditional institutions, or simply irrelevant to practical local goals.

Some of the commonalities and differences may be in fact be due to national and cultural differences. For example, the capacity of many North American (and particularly US) universities to engage in service learning as part of progressive charters in communities large and small is part of a long-standing tradition absent elsewhere. The tradition of service learning is almost entirely absent in the UK, Australia, or New Zealand, (and of limited significance in Canada) where the State has traditionally played a much stronger role in the delivery of community services and information.

In some countries such as the UK, there is a tradition of locally based grassroots community technology, for example in Manchester, or in Hebden Bridge. In Italy and the Netherlands, there also appears to have been a strong connection between the development of local civic networks based around a tradition of civic oppositionism, connected into the work of progressive academics.

In Latin America, Africa and many parts of Asia these efforts have been driven by external funding agencies as part of larger programs and initiatives in support of broader economic and social development goals. However, these efforts have now become significantly "indigenized" (and particularly in Latin America) and "bottom-up" ICT efforts are increasingly playing a leading role in defining the future use of ICT within local communities.

In Canada, The Canadian Research Alliance for Community Innovation and Networking (CRACIN) was established in 2003. Their goal is to explore and archive the status and achievements of CI activities in Canada. It is a research partnership between scholastics, specialists, and public sector delegates.

== Networks ==
There are emerging online and personal networks of researchers and practitioners in community informatics and community networking in many countries as well as international groupings. The past decade has also seen conferences in many countries, and there is an emerging literature for theoreticians and practitioners including the on-line Journal of Community Informatics.

It is surprising in fact, how much in common is found when people from developed and non-developed countries meet. A common theme is the struggle to convince policy makers of the legitimacy of this approach to developing electronically literate societies, instead of a top-down or trickle-down approach, or an approach dominated by technical, rather than social solutions which in the end, tend to help vendors rather than communities. A common criticism that is frequently raised amongst participants at events such as the Prato conferences is that a focus on technical solutions evades the social changes that communities need to achieve in their values, activities and other people-oriented outcomes in order to make better use of technology.

The field tends to have a progressive bent, being concerned about the use of technology for social and cultural development connected to a desire for capacity building or expanding social capital, and in a number of countries, governments and foundations have funded a variety of community informatics projects and initiatives, particularly from a more tightly controlled, though not well-articulated social planning perspective, though knowledge about long-term effects of such forms of social intervention on use of technology is still in its early stages.

=== Public libraries and community networks ===
Even though that community networks and public libraries have similitudes in various ways, there are some obstacles that upset the probability of cooperation in the future between them. Albeit both CNs and libraries are concerned with giving information services to the society, an exchange is by all accounts lacking between the two communities. The mission of libraries is frequently rather barely engaged and, with regards to managing people and different institutes, their methodology can be to some degree unbending. Thusly, CN specialists, while institutionally more adaptable, rush to expel the part of public libraries in the community, tending to see the library essentially as a store of books upheld by public subsidizing. Public libraries have a long-standing custom of association with their communities, yet their conditions and concerns contrast from those of community networks (CNs).

== See also ==
- Circuit rider (technology)
- Community Memory
- Digital divide
- Informatics
- Living lab
- Nonprofit technology
- Piazza Telematica
- Social Study of Information Systems
- Social identity model of deindividuation effects (SIDE)
- Social informatics
- Social information processing theory
- Sociology of the Internet
- Urban informatics
