= Nonprofit technology =

Technology for nonprofit organizations

Nonprofit technology is the deliberative use of technology by nonprofit organizations to maximize potential in numerous areas, primarily in supporting the organization mission and meeting reporting requirements to funders and regulators.

Types of technology do not differ between nonprofit and for profit organizations. Nonprofit technology is differentiated by specific strategies and purposes. Numerous nonprofit organizations approach technology with an emphasis on cost effectiveness due to limited budgets. Information technology in particular offers low-cost solutions for nonprofits to address administrative, service and marketing needs. Technology deployment grants nonprofits the opportunity to better allocate staff resources away from administrative tasks to focus on direct services provided by the organization.

== Definitional issues ==
Due to the topic's inherent breadth of reach and the constantly changing nature of technology in general, the sphere of nonprofit technology is somewhat difficult to define. Despite this, in order to provide a stable foundation upon which the remainder of this discussion can stand, it is necessary to engage in laying a groundwork of both baseline and integrated definitional constructs.

Nonprofit technology can be generally defined as any technological tool that assists a nonprofit organization by helping it to work with greater social impact in forwarding the overall organizational mission. Technology is essential to effectively advancing and managing a nonprofit, playing an important role in the advertisement of goods and services offered, the communication of mission, and the recruitment of volunteers among other things. From thoughtful utilization to enhance both internal and external organizational communication efforts, to increased ability to measure, evaluate, and more successfully track and engage specific initiatives, the use of technology within the nonprofit sector is wide-ranging.

Technology use associated with nonprofits is not dedicated in nature, that is, technologies and specific uses of such technology by nonprofits cannot be linked solely to the nonprofit sector. Because of this, constructing a definition of nonprofit technology is based in large part on use.

== Uses ==
Nonprofit organizations use computers, Internet and other networking technology for a number of tasks, including volunteer management and support, donor management, client tracking and support, project management, human resources (paid staff) management, financial accounting, program evaluation, research, marketing, activism and collaboration. Nonprofit organizations that engage in income-generation activities, such as ticket sales, may also use technology for these functions.

Some technology programs are created specifically for use by nonprofit organizations. For instance, there are more than 30 software packages designed for nonprofits to use to analyse donations, manage volunteers. There is software designed to help in the management of animal shelters, software to help nonprofit manage pets, animal rescue, county code management software to help nonprofit performing arts groups sell tickets and manage donors, software to manage sports clubs, and on and on.

Nonprofit organizations also use both proprietary and open-source software, as well as various online tools (the World Wide Web, email, online social networking, wikis, micro-blogging, etc.), that are also used by for-profit businesses. Nonprofit groups may leverage web-based services in their media outreach, using online newswires such as Nonprofit Newswire.com to disseminate their press releases.

Because of their limited budgets, nonprofit organizations may not be able to upgrade their hardware or software, buy computers or Internet tools, or provide technology training for staff to the degree of for-profit businesses. This means that, often, nonprofit organizations can be on the wrong side of the digital divide.

== Social media ==
The use of social media by nonprofits should follow a stewardship model that includes acts of reciprocity, responsibility, and accountability in an effort to nurture nonprofit relationships and place supporters at the forefront. Referencing organizational partners and supporters is one way in which these ideals can be expressed through social media use. Furthermore, listing the nonprofits specific use of donations and volunteers as well as posting the names of board members and mission statement can cover the responsibility and accountability components.

And although most social media sites provide free services, for social media to be most effective, organizations must provide on-going interactional experiences for users, which requires additional man-hours. It is estimated that for a mid-size nonprofit with revenue between $1 and $5 million annually, having a social media presence will cost, on average, $11 thousand annually to attain an adequate level of interaction. Examples of such interactional components for a nonprofit website might include: downloadable video, RSS feeds, chat rooms, polls or surveys, linked publications and always, contact information.

In a poll conducted with mid-sized nonprofit organizations, 51 percent reported that between one and five hours were spent weekly attending to social media. Additionally, as the nonprofits social media presence grew, more hours were required to sustain the same level of interaction. Yet, these same nonprofit respondents, that had been using social media for at least 12 months, reported less than stellar results for attracting new donors or volunteers, which had been one of the main motivations for establishing a social media presence. Therefore, if a nonprofit organization is insistent on an established social media presence, it is advised to continue direct channels of communication such as direct mailings which still outperforms email and social media marketing.

== Practitioners/sources of training and support ==
Whereas a for-profit business may have the budget to hire a full-time staff member or part-time consultant to help with computer and Internet technology use, nonprofit organizations usually have fewer financial resources and, therefore, may not be able to hire a full-time staff person to manage and support technology use. While there are nonprofits that can afford to pay staff devoted to managing and supporting the nonprofits technology needs, many of those who support nonprofits in their technology use are staff members who have different primary roles (called accidental techies) and volunteers.

Those providing support to nonprofit organizations regarding their use of computers, the Internet and networking technologies are sometimes known as eRiders or circuit riders, or more broadly as NTAPs (Nonprofit Technology Assistance Providers).

A membership association for people volunteering or working for pay to support nonprofit technology is NTEN: The Nonprofit Technology Enterprise Network.

== Sources of hardware and software ==
A variety of organizations support NPOs' acquisition of technology, either hardware or software.

Certain NPOs (for example Free Geek or Nonprofit Technology Resources) support local NPOs with discounted refurbished personal computers.

In the United States and Canada, a web-based membership association that provides non-profit organizations with discounts on products and services, including technology providers, is the Non-Profit Purchasing Group.

For developing areas or nations, technology may be available from organizations mentioned in Computer technology for developing areas.

== Best practices/guiding principles for effective adoption ==
A number of contributing factors have effected non-profits' ability to adopt information technology in recent history. Cutbacks in public sector services, decreases in government spending, increased scrutiny on the public sector, increased competition and increased financial transparency are all issues facing non-profit organizations today. Due to these issues, it has become increasingly important for non-profits to be aware of best practices and potential pitfalls when adopting effective IT practices in the public sector.

Planning has become one of the most important practices for the successful strategic utilization of information technology. A 2003 study found that 79 percent of organizations in 2003 (up from 55 percent in 2000) had some sort of "strategic plan" specifically for the use of the Internet, tending to be "medium-sized charities with medium income and larger Web budgets, as well as those that set their sites up earlier and update them more frequently." Among the most important practices in IT planning are budgeting, training and staffing. A 2007 study from the Public Administration Review shows that the majority of nonprofits budget for purchasing and upgrading hardware (57 percent) and software (58 percent), as well as computer maintenance (63 percent), but only 36 percent budget for computer-related training. However, these planning methods receive only 9 percent of the budget after personnel costs are removed, which is of particular importance because 56 percent of nonprofits report that less than 2 percent is available for these essential IT activities. The amount set aside for training varies considerably depending on overall budgets, making training a luxury for lower-budget organizations.

== See also ==
- Capacity building
- Circuit rider
- Community informatics
- Community technology center
- Internet activism
- Computer technology for developing areas
- NTAP (Nonprofit technology assistance provider)
- The Rosetta Foundation
