= Living lab =

Lab for Innovation and Research

The concept of the living lab has been defined in multiple ways. A definition from the European Network of Living Labs (ENoLL) is used most widely, describing them as "user-centred open innovation ecosystems” that integrate research and innovation through co-creation in real-world environments.

Emerging at the intersection of ambient intelligence research and user experience methodologies in the late 1990s, the concept was pioneered at the Massachusetts Institute of Technology (MIT) as a way to study human interaction with new technologies in natural settings. Over time, living labs have evolved beyond their origins as controlled research environments, becoming dynamic platforms for participatory design, collaborative experimentation, and iterative innovation across various domains, including urban development, healthcare, sustainability, and digital technology. Characterized by principles such as real-world experimentation, active user involvement, and multi-stakeholder collaboration, living labs enable the continuous adaptation and validation of solutions in everyday contexts. Today, they are implemented globally, supported by networks like the European Network of Living Labs (ENoLL), and increasingly recognized as vital tools for addressing local and global transformation agendas.

== Background ==
The term "living lab" has emerged in parallel from the ambient intelligence (AmI) research communities context and from the discussion on experience and application research (EAR). The emergence of the term is based on the concept of user experience and ambient intelligence.

The term dates back to the late 1990s when Professor William J. Mitchell, Kent Larson, and Alex (Sandy) Pentland at the Massachusetts Institute of Technology were credited with first exploring the concept of a living laboratory. It was first associated with MIT's Media Lab as a concept for studying real-life contexts, where they described a living lab as a controlled environment designed to test new information and communication technology (ICT) innovations in a simulated home setting. This was also when some of the key characteristics often assigned to living labs today began to take shape. They argued that a living lab represents a user-centric research methodology for sensing, prototyping, validating and refining complex solutions in multiple and evolving real-life contexts.

Research on living labs has expanded since the 1990s, especially in the 2010s, with growing interest in co-creation and participatory design. Particularly in Europe, the living lab evolved into a model that focused on studying user interactions with technology in real-world environments. This shift was influenced by earlier experiences in participatory design and social experiments with ICT. As interest grew, the term began to encompass a broader array of initiatives and projects, leading to variations in its interpretation and implementation. Today, living labs are used in various fields, such as technology, healthcare, and urban sustainability, showing a transition from a narrow focus on their role as controlled environments to a more wide-ranging understanding of collaborative innovation addressing real societal challenges, while also being referred to with various descriptions and definitions available from different sources.

== Description ==
The ENoLL definition that refers to living labs as "user-centred open innovation ecosystems” that integrate research and innovation through co-creation in real-world environments is the most widely accepted description of living labs in academic literature. In simple terms, living labs can be described as an organization or experimental space, that can be both virtually or physically located, bringing different stakeholders from research, business, government, and citizens together to design and test solutions to be implemented in a real world environment. A common definition for the living lab term still does not exist to this day, which is due to the fact that living labs are interpreted and implemented across different contexts and can cover a wide range of activities and organizations, leading to different understandings of how living labs should function. Living labs also often operate in various territorial contexts (e.g. city, agglomeration, region, campus), and can vary in their methodological approach integrating concurrent research and innovation processes within a public-private-people partnership.

Despite these variations, common characteristics include user-centricity, real-world experimentation, multi-stakeholder collaboration, and iterative innovation processes.

The systematic user co-creation approach refers to integrating research and innovation processes through the co-creation, exploration, experimentation and evaluation of innovative ideas, scenarios, concepts and related technological artefacts in real life use cases. Such use cases involve user communities, not only as observed subjects but also as a source of creation. This approach allows all involved stakeholders to concurrently consider both the global performance of a product or service and its potential adoption by users. This consideration may be made at the earlier stage of research and development and through all elements of the product life-cycle, from design up to recycling. User-centred research methods, such as action research, community informatics, contextual design, user-centered design, participatory design, empathic design, emotional design, and other usability methods, already exist but fail to sufficiently empower users for co-creating into open development environments. More recently, the Web 2.0 has demonstrated the positive impact of involving user communities in new product development (NPD) such as mass collaboration projects (e.g. crowdsourcing, Wisdom of Crowds) in collectively creating new contents and applications.

Real-world experimentation emphasizes conducting activities in real-life settings to ensure that the results of the projects and solutions are applicable to actual market conditions. Multi-stakeholder collaboration refers to an approach that involved various stakeholders, such as users, businesses, researchers, and government entities, working together towards a common goal. This is an important characteristics of living lab because collaboration of these diverse groups allows for exchange of ideas and perspectives, which are thought to enhance innovation processes. Iterative innovation processes involve a cyclical method of developing products or services, where stages such as research, development, testing, and implementation are revisited multiple times based on feedback and evaluation. This process allows for continuous improvement of the innovation, product, or service being developed. In particular, the ongoing involvement of the user creates feedback mechanisms that are ultimately key to successful development and implementation of products and services.

A living lab is not similar to a testbed as its philosophy is to turn users, from being traditionally considered as observed subjects for testing modules against requirements, into value creation in contributing to the co-creation and exploration of emerging ideas, breakthrough scenarios, innovative concepts and related artefacts. Hence, a living lab rather constitutes an experiential environment, which could be compared to the concept of experiential learning, where users are immersed in a creative social space for designing and experiencing their own future. Living labs could also be used by policy makers and users/citizens for designing, exploring, experiencing and refining new policies and regulations in real-life scenarios for evaluating their potential impacts before their implementations.

== European Network of Living Labs (ENoLL) ==
The European Network of Living Labs (ENoLL) is an international, non-profit, independent association of certified living labs, which popularized the living lab concept in the aim to increase user involvement in innovation. Formed in November 2006 under the guidance of the Finnish European Presidency, ENoLL is composed of a variety of stakeholders, including municipalities and research institutes, businesses, and users. Its primary role is to support the collaboration among living labs across Europe and includes many living labs focused on user-driven innovation across sectors.

ENoLL focuses on facilitating knowledge exchange, joint actions and project partnerships among its historically labelled +/- 500 members, influencing EU policies, promoting living labs and enabling their implementation worldwide. ENoLL serves as a platform for linking living labs around the globe, which enables knowledge sharing and collaborative learning among diverse cultural environments. Membership to the platform is open to organizations worldwide, and ENoLL has expanded beyond Europe to include global members. ENoLL follows an application and accreditation process, where aspiring living labs must demonstrate adherence to core principles of user-centered, open innovation and real-life experimentation. Successful applicants are officially recognized as accredited living labs and become part of the ENoLL network.

== How it works ==
In practice, living labs place the citizen at the core of innovation, ensuring that new information and communication technology (ICT) solutions align with local needs. Living labs bring together multiple stakeholders - typically from the quadruple helix, which includes government, industry, academia, and civil society - to create a shared vision, mission and strategic goals.

Living labs emphasize active user participation, which means participants, especially end-users such as citizens, are not only engaged as testers but also as co-creators who provide insights and feedback during various development phases. Users in living labs can therefore take on multiple roles, including informants, testers, contributors, and co-creators to bring their knowledge, experience, and needs at the forefront of development activities. The utilizers, often including private or public organizations, will gain from the outcomes of the innovation activities and also play an important role in the initiating the set up of the lab and promotion of living lab initiatives to advance their own agendas. Researchers are often involved in facilitating the innovation process, through conducting studies, disseminating findings, and collaborating with users and businesses. Government entities participate in the living lab ecosystem by providing regulatory frameworks and infrastructure necessary for innovation, and they also support projects that align with public interests.

A framework for understanding the functioning of living labs, was introduced by Dr. Dimitri Schuurman in his 2015 PhD dissertation, Bridging the gap between open and user innovation. This three-layered model is commonly used within the European Network of Living Labs (ENoLL), and describes living labs as operating on three levels:

- Macro Level (Living Lab Constellation): On a macro level, a living lab functions a public-private-people partnership, involving various stakeholders from these sectors who collaborate on living lab research and projects.
- Meso level (Living Lab Projects): This level includes the specific innovation projects undertaken within the living lab constellation, where stakeholders apply co-creation methodologies.
- Micro Level (Research Activities): At this level research activities are conducted within living lab projects using structured methodologies to gather user-led insights and capture tacit, experiential, and domain-based knowledge

== Key elements ==
Despite the wide variety in methodological approaches and contexts within which living labs operate, all living labs use the six same building blocks. ENoLL, the European Network of Living Labs, describes them as follows:

- Orchestration: the living lab operates as the orchestrator within the ecosystem to connect and partner up with relevant stakeholders
- Multi-stakeholder participation: taking a holistic view on society, involving stakeholders from the quadruple helix model (government, academia, private sector, and citizens)
- Active user involvement: a living lab involves relevant stakeholders 'actively' in all relevant activities, ensuring their feedback is captured and implemented throughout the whole lifecycle of the innovation
- Co-creation: in a living lab, values are bottom-up co-created not only for but also by all relevant stakeholders, ensuring a higher adoption at the end
- Real-life settings: a living lab operates in the real-life setting of the end users, infusing innovations into their real life instead of moving the users to test sites to explore the innovations
- Multi method approach: each living lab activity is problem driven. Therefore, the methodological approach towards every individual activity will be selected based on the expected outcomes of the activity and the stakeholders who needs to be involved.

== Types ==
From a conceptual perspective, there are many 'types' of living labs, yet four broad categories can be established as follows:

- Urban and rural living labs: Opening the city/region as a site for experimentation (+) co-creation, active user engagement, real-life settings experimentation, multi-stakeholders, multi-method.
- Campus living labs: These labs utilize campus infrastructure as a platform for applied research and learning, allowing students to engage in real-world projects that enhance their educational experience.
- Living testbed (provider focused): this type of Living lab focuses on the development of new technologies and the acceptance of it by society via demonstration projects (e.g. House/Farm of the future, Industry 4.0 labs
- Living labs as a service (for SME's & start ups): offering general LL tools & methodologies to companies to help them accelerate their innovation funnels

Most living labs can be a combination of the above mentioned categories, but their primary focus is centered on one of these types.

The urban living lab (ULLs) is increasingly recognized to address a wide range of sustainability issues in the cities, ranging from environmental degradation to social inequality. For instance, in the context of circular economy initiatives, ULLs have been instrumental to bring together citizens, businesses, and public institutions to design and implement projects that reduce waste and promote resource efficiency. ULLs further leverage the involvement of citizens in data collection and experimentation, raising awareness about environmental issues such as air pollution and climate change. Initiatives like the I-CHANGE project promotes citizen science by empowering citizens in taking an active role in driving change. Finally, ULLs are though to be important mechanisms to promote sustainability transitions. By providing a space for experimentation and learning, ULLs enable cities to test and refine innovative solutions before scaling them up. The meta-lab approach, which connects multiple ULLs across different urban contexts, has been proposed as a way to accelerate learning and diffusion of successful practices, thereby supporting system-wide sustainability transformation.

== See also ==
- Business cluster
- Citilab
- Concurrent engineering
- Context awareness
- Human-computer interaction
- Information science
- Social computing
