= NTEN =

Nonprofit organization based in the United States

- Formation: 2000
- Tax ID no.: 91-2072298
- Headquarters: Portland, Oregon
- CEO: Amy Sample Ward
- Chief Program Officer: Ash Shepherd
- Website: www.nten.org

NTEN is an international nonprofit organization based in the United States. Founded in 2000, NTEN offers training and certificate programs for nonprofit staff learning about the equitable use of technology. Their CEO Amy Sample Ward was on the NonProfit Times Top 50 Influencers list every year from 2015 through 2020. The organization was named "the best small non-profit to work for" in Oregon by the magazine Oregon Business in 2019.

== Overview ==
NTEN was originally incorporated as The Nonprofit Technology Enterprise Network and is now known solely as NTEN. Described in the Nonprofit Quarterly as "One of the more recent and potentially powerful networks evolving in the nonprofit technology-assistance scene", the association provides forums for people involved in nonprofit technology, acts as a conduit for connecting journalists and researchers with nonprofit technology practitioners, makes technology information and resources available to organizations, and undertakes research for the sector. It runs the annual Nonprofit Technology Conference (NTC) in the US as well as co-hosting other events. In 2012, the company created Tech Accelerate, a tool for making assessment about technology use and policies designed for nonprofit staff to assist them with decisions, planning, and investments.

== Research and publications ==
NTEN publishes research reports about issues affecting nonprofits. In 2017 they published their tenth annual Nonprofit Technology Staffing and Investments Report looking at where nonprofits spend their IT money, determining that they were spending more money on software than hardware and that over half provided funding for technology-specific training. In 2018 NTEN surveyed 250 nonprofits and published a report, State of Nonprofit Cybersecurity, concluding that while many organizations maintain adequate data backups, many have no policies on cyberattacks, and "only 40 percent said they provide regular cybersecurity training for staff." Other publications include:

- Equity Guide for Nonprofit Technology
- 2022 Data Empowerment Report
- Nonprofits and Artificial Intelligence
- Cybersecurity for Nonprofits

== Digital Inclusion ==
In 2015 NTEN partnered with Google Fiber to create a Digital Inclusion Fellowship program sponsoring 68 fellows across the US working with local organizations to assist in launching or expanding digital literacy programs. In 2019 the company began requiring salary information in postings on its job board citing equity reasons.

In 2020 the organization pulled their advertising from Facebook in response to their content moderation and data privacy policies. In January 2021, NTEN supported the impeachment and removal of President Trump. In October 2022, citing an increase in hate speech, the company stopped buying ads and sharply reduced its use of the Twitter platform.

== See also ==
- Nonprofit technology
- Circuit rider (Technology)
