= Telecentre =

Public place where people can access digital technologies

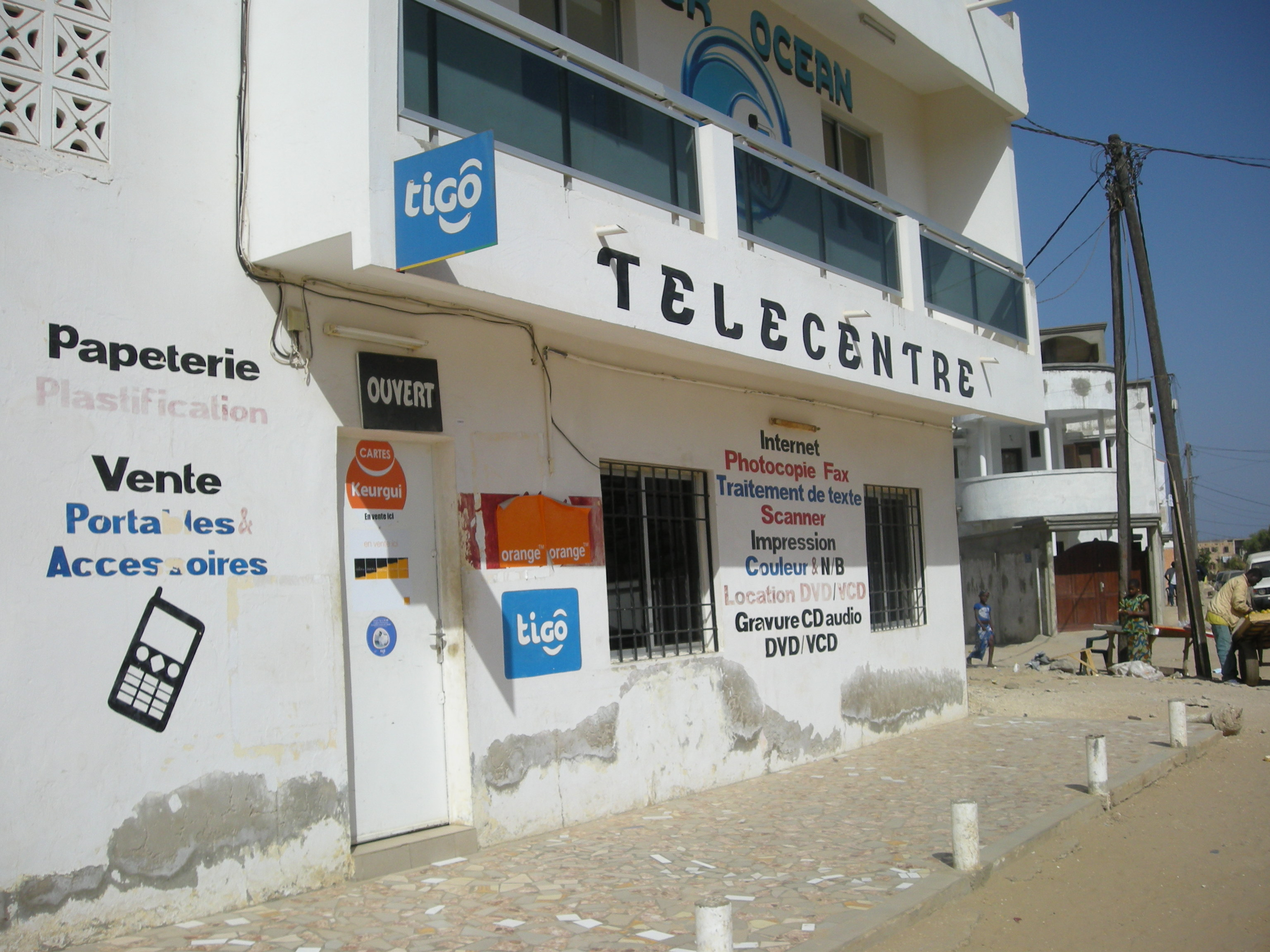
Telecentre building in Senegal

A telecentre is a public place where people can access computers, the Internet, and other digital technologies that enable them to gather information, create, learn, and communicate with others (information and communications technology, ICT) while they develop essential digital skills. Telecentres exist in almost every country, although they sometimes go by a different names including public internet access centre (PIAP), village knowledge centre, infocentre, telecottage, electronic village hall, community technology center (CTC), community multimedia center (CMC), multipurpose community telecentre (MCT), common/citizen service centre (CSC) and school-based telecentre. While each telecentre is different, their common focus is on the use of digital technologies to support community, economic, educational, and social development—reducing isolation, bridging the digital divide, promoting health issues, creating economic opportunities, leveraging information communications technology for development (ICT4D), and empowering youth.

== Evolution of the telecentre movement ==
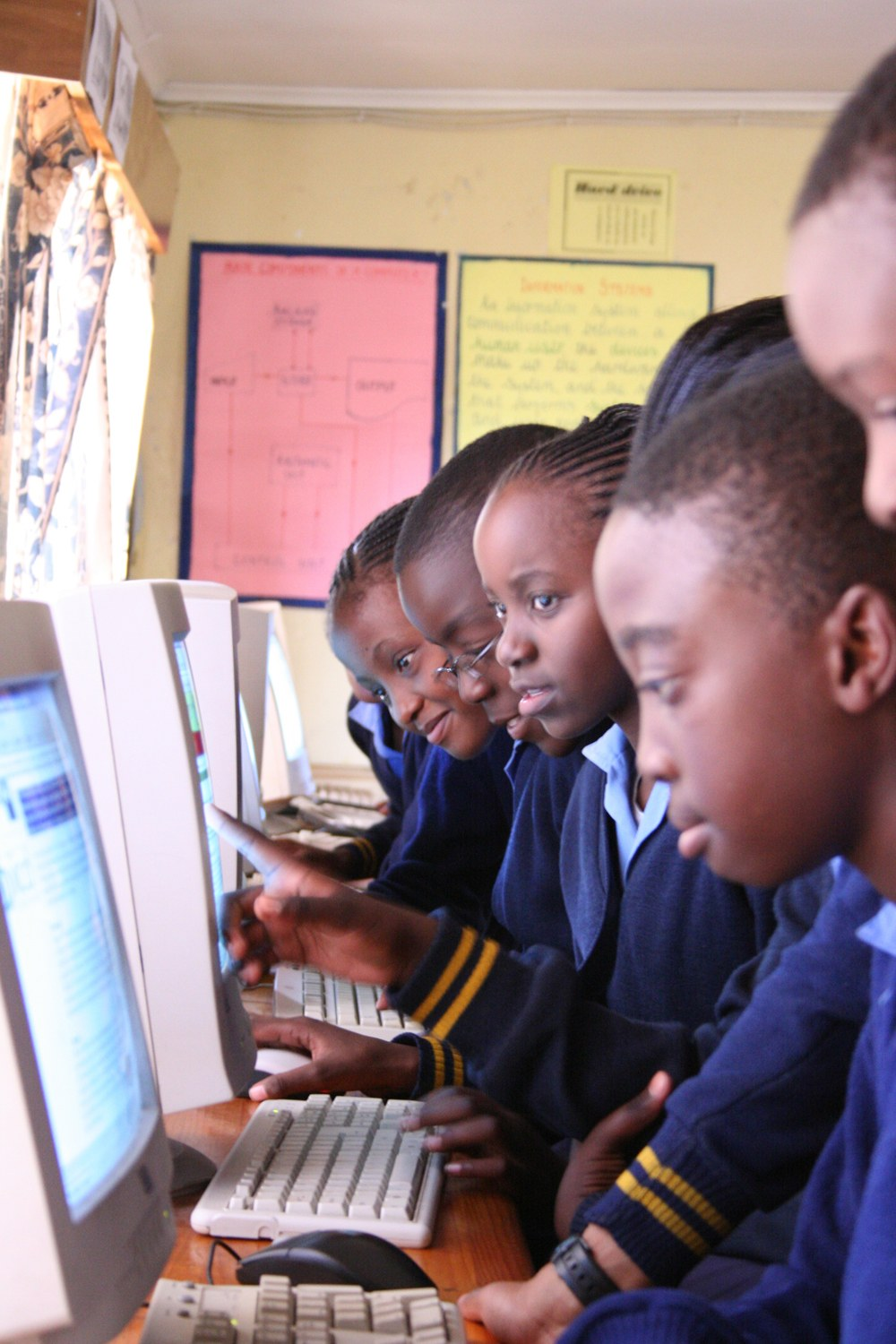
African children in a telecentre in Zambia

The telecentre movement's origins can be traced to Europe's telecottage and Electronic Village Halls (originally in Denmark) and Community Technology Centers (CTCs) in the United States, both of which emerged in the 1980s as a result of advances in computing. At a time when computers were available but not yet a common household good, public access to computers emerged as a solution. Today, although home ownership of computers is widespread in the United States and other industrialized countries, there remains a need for free public access to computing, whether it is in CTCs, telecottages or public libraries to ensure that everyone has access to technologies that have become essential.

There are also CTCs located in most of the states of Australia, they are also known as Community Resource Centres (often abbreviated to CRC) that provide technology, resources, training and educational programs to communities in regional, rural and remote areas.

== Types ==
Beyond the differences in names, public ICT access centers are diverse, varying in the clientele they serve, the services they provide, as well as their business or organizational model. Around the world, some telecentres include NGO-sponsored, local government, commercial, school-based, and university-related In the United States and other countries, public access to the Internet in libraries may also be considered within the “telecentre concept”, especially when the range of services offered is not limited to pure access but also includes training end-users. Each type has advantages and disadvantages when considering attempts to link communities with ICTs and to bridge the digital divide. Among the various types:

- NGO-sponsored telecentres are hosted by an NGO, which manages the center and integrates it, to one degree or another, into the organization's core business.
- Local government telecentres seek to further local development; they often aim to disseminate information, decentralize services, and encourage civic participation, in addition to providing public ICT access.
- Commercial telecentres, launched by entrepreneurs for profit, range from the purely commercial cybercafé to the social enterprise, where profit and social good objectives are combined.
- School-based telecentres can be structured to involve community members during off-school hours, but costs need to be shared by the school system and the community.
- University-related telecentres can offer social outreach to disadvantaged and community groups, provide training, develop locally relevant content, and establish and facilitate virtual networks.
- Internet access in public libraries.

== Need for telecentres ==
It is estimated that 40% of the world's population has less than US$20 per year available to spend on ICT. In Brazil, the poorest 20% of the population counts with merely US$9 per year to spend on ICT (US$0.75 per month). In Mexico, the poorest 20% of the society counts with an estimated US$35 per year (US$3 per month). For Latin America it is estimated that the borderline between ICT as a necessity good and ICT as a luxury good is roughly around the "magical number" of US$10 per person per month, or US$120 per year.

== Telecentres and international development institutions ==
In the 1990s, international development institutions such as Canada's International Development Research Centre (IDRC) and UNESCO, sponsored the deployment of many telecentres in developing countries. Both IDRC and UNESCO are still very involved in the telecentre movement. The former telecentre.org programme at IDRC was transferred to the telecentre.org Foundation in the Philippines in March 2010 and continues to support networks of telecentres around the world. Within the Philippines, the Department of Science and Technology (DOST) has rolled-out Tech4ED (Technology for Education, to gain Employment, train Entrepreneurs towards Economic Development). This telecenter program has implemented over 42,000 centers throughout the countryside to promote citizen participation in e-Government services and provide IT education to the masses, specifically, the underserved and marginalized citizens within the country. UNESCO continues to support the growth of community multimedia centers (CMCs), which, unlike most other telecentres, have a local community radio, television or other media component.

== Sustainability considerations ==
In light of the rapidly evolving technologies that support telecentres and in light of the increased penetration of mobile technologies (i.e., cell phones), the telecentre model needs to continuously evolve in order to remain relevant and to continue to address the changing needs of the communities they serve. As mobile communication technologies become more pervasive around the world, including in rural areas, the telecentres may no longer need to provide phone services, yet they may still be very relevant in terms of access to web-enabled e-government services, e-Learning, and basic Internet communication needs (email and web browsing).

Among the various sustainability considerations:

- Evolving models – since the local demand for information and communication services is evolving, the telecentre models need to evolve as well. Franchises and other approaches to linking and networking telecentres are proving to be popular.
- Evolving technologies – wireless connectivity technologies, beyond VSAT (known to be expensive) are being explored in many communities around the world. These technologies provide new opportunities for connecting communities through telecentres and eventually at the individual household level.
- Evolving services – the types of services that telecentres can and should provide is also rapidly evolving. As the fields of eGovernment, eHealth, e-Learning, eCommerce are evolving and maturing in many countries, telecentres need to take advantage of opportunities to extend the benefits to the community at large, through their public access. Some governments are pursuing the deployment of telecentres precisely as a means of ensuring that larger segments of the population are able to access government services and information through electronic channels.
- Community stakeholders – identifying leaders among the community who champion the concept of shared services through telecentre mode, play a crucial role as a bridge between the telecentre operator and hesitant villagers. Indeed, There is a maturing period during which community leaders have to invest constant efforts to drive changes of behaviour in the adoption of innovations.
- Community involvement is required however, at the initial phase of the telecentre set up, starting with the site selection and creating a sort of empathy and feeling of empowerment. Furthermore, the telecentre should be well rooted in the socio-cultural context of the community.

== Networks ==
The telecentres of today and of the future are networked telecentres, or telecentres of the 2.0 generation. Increasingly, telecentres are not operating as independent, isolated entities but as members of a network. At times, the network takes the form of a franchise. In other circumstances, the network is much more informal.

One such regional network targeted towards Asia-Pacific is, the Asia-Pacific Telecentre Network.

In the United States, more than 1,000 community technology centers were organized under the leadership of CTCnet, a nonprofit association headquartered in Washington, D.C. CTCs are also organized under the banner of state organizations, such as the Ohio Community Computing Network, or city programs such the City of Seattle Community Technology Program. and Austin FreeNet.

== Further information ==
For more information on telecentre networks, visit the archive of the web site telecentre.org. An overview of telecentre networks can also be found in Chapter 7 of Making the Connection: Scaling Telecentres for Development.

Additional information about concept of community telecentres can also be found in the online book From the Ground Up: the evolution of the telecentre movement.

Additional information about the practice of building and sustaining telecentres can be found in this page on Telecentre Sustainability.

Additional information about the social, political, economic, and technical problems and challenges facing the development and sustainability of telecentres can be found at Telecenters.

There is a growing research and analytical literature on telecentres and other community based technology initiatives and approaches particularly within the context of Community informatics as an academic discipline and through the Journal of Community Informatics.

== See also ==
- BytesForAll
- Community informatics
- Computer technology for developing areas
- Free Geek
- Internet café
- NetDay
- Nomad worker
- Nonprofit technology
- Public computer
- Serviced office
- Small office/home office
- Telecottage
