= SSEAL =

SSEAL may refer to:

- Swiss Laboratory Animal Science Association, see Life Sciences Switzerland
- South-Southeast Asia Library of the University of California, Berkeley Libraries (Berkeley, California)
