= Van der Goot =

Van der Goot is a Dutch surname. Notable people with the surname include:

- Auke van der Goot (born 1952), Dutch civil servant and politician
- Gisou van der Goot (born 1964), Swiss-Dutch cell biologist
- Willemijn Posthumus-van der Goot (1897–1989). Dutch economist, feminist and radio broadcaster
