= Walter Rudolf Hess =

Swiss physiologist (1881–1973)

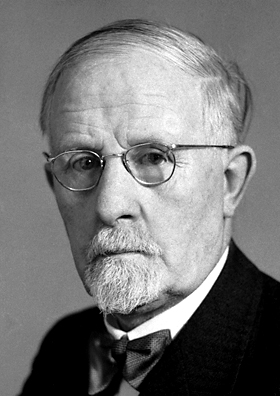
- Born: 17 March 1881; Frauenfeld, Thurgau, Switzerland
- Died: 12 August 1973 (aged 92); Locarno, Ticino, Switzerland
- Education: University of Zurich
- Awards: Marcel Benoist Prize (1931); Nobel Prize in Physiology or Medicine (1949)
- Scientific career
- Fields: Physiology
- Workplaces: University of Zurich, ETH Zürich

Walter Rudolf Hess (17 March 1881 – 12 August 1973) was a Swiss physiologist who won the Nobel Prize in Physiology or Medicine in 1949 for mapping the areas of the brain involved in the control of internal organs. He shared the prize with Egas Moniz.

== Early life and education ==
Hess was born in Frauenfeld as the second of three children to Clemens Hess and Gertrud Hess (née Fischer). His father encouraged him to pursue a scientific career and with him he conducted experiments in his physics laboratory. He started to study medicine in Lausanne in 1899 and then in Berlin, Kiel and Zürich. He received his medical degree from the University of Zurich in 1906 and trained as surgeon in Münsterlingen (in the same canton as his birthplace Frauenfeld) under Conrad Brunner (1859–1927). He developed a viscosimeter to measure blood viscosity and published his dissertation in 1906 titled Zum Thema Viskosität des Blutes und Herzarbeit. In 1907, he went to the University of Zurich to study under Otto Haab to be trained as an ophthalmologist and opened his own private practice in Rapperswil SG. In these years, he developed the "Hess screen", married Louise Sandmeier and in 1910 their daughter Gertrud Hess was born. In 1913 his son Rudolf Max Hess was born.

In 1912, he left his lucrative private practice as an ophthalmologist and went into research under Justus Gaule (1849–1939), habilitating in 1913 to become Privatdozent. His primary interests were the regulation of blood flow and respiration. During the First World War he spent a year at the Physiological Institute of the University of Bonn under Max Verworn. In 1916, Gaule retired and Hess first became interim director of the Department of the Physiological Institute at the University of Zurich. Hess served as full professor and director of the institute from 1917 until his retirement in 1951.

In the 1930s, he began mapping the parts of the diencephalon that control the internal organs using cats. This research won him the Nobel prize in Physiology and Medicine 1949. Hess also helped to found the meteorological research foundation International Foundation for the High Alpine Research Station Jungfraujoch in 1930 and served as its director until 1937. Furthermore, he politically campaigned against the anti-vivisectionists that wanted to forbid animal experimentation.

Hess retired in 1951 but continued working at the university in an office. In 1967, he moved to Ascona and died of heart failure in 1973 at the age of 92 in Locarno, Switzerland. His widow died in 1987.

== Research ==
Hess used brain stimulation techniques developed in the late 1920s. Using electrodes, Hess stimulated the brain at well-defined anatomical regions. This allowed him to map regions of the brain to specific physiological responses. He developed a special technique he called "interrupted direct-current (DC) stimulation" which used stimuli of long duration (typically 12.5 or 25 ms) with ramp-like upward and downward slopes. Also, the stimuli were rather weak (around 0.5–1.5 V) and of low frequency (2–12 Hz, usually 8 Hz) and he used very fine electrodes with a diameter of 0.25 mm.

By stimulating the hypothalamus, he could induce behaviors from excitement to apathy; depending on the region of stimulation. He found that he could induce different responses when stimulating the anterior (lateral) hypothalamus compared to stimulating the posterior ventromedial hypothalamus. When stimulating the anterior part, he could induce fall of blood pressure, slowing of respiration and responses such as hunger, thirst, micturition (urination) and defecation. Stimulation of the posterior part led to extreme excitement and defense-like behavior.

Hess also found that he could induce sleep in cats – a finding that was highly controversial at the time but later confirmed by other researchers, including his son Rudolf Max Hess.

== Honours ==
- Marcel Benoist Prize (1932)
- Honorary doctorates at the University of Bern, University of Geneva, McGill University, University of Freiburg
- Nobel prize in Physiology and Medicine (1949)
