= Ernst Hadorn =

Swiss geneticist and zoologist (1902–1976)

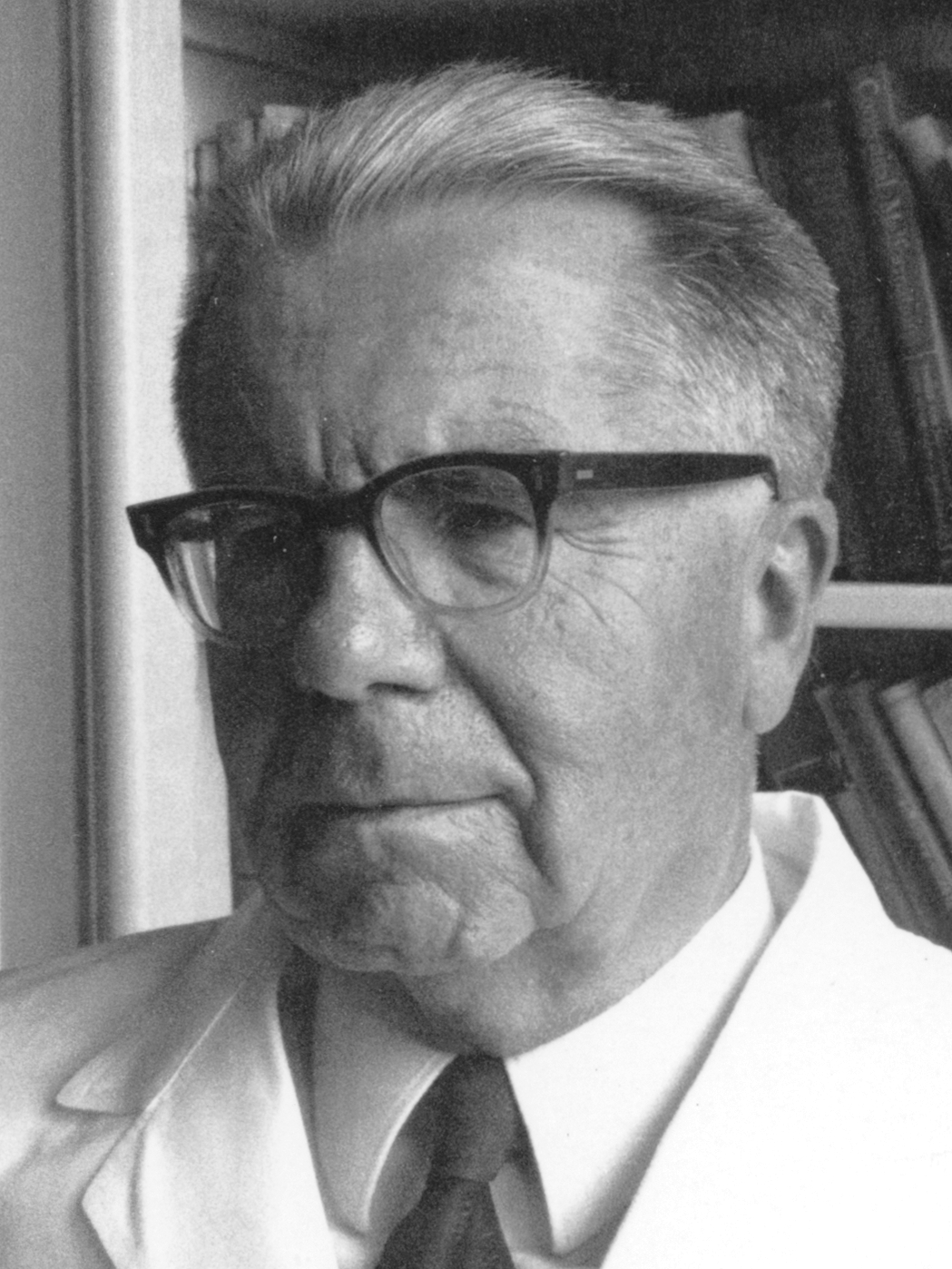
- Born: 31 May 1902; Forst, Switzerland
- Died: 4 April 1976 (aged 73); Wohlen bei Bern, Switzerland
- Education: University of Bern (Ph.D. 1931)
- Known for: Developmental Genetics and Lethal Factors
- Awards: Marcel Benoist Prize
- Scientific career
- Fields: Developmental biology, genetics
- Institutions: University of Rochester, University of Zurich
- Doctoral advisor: Fritz Baltzer

Ernst Hadorn (31 May 1902–4 April 1976) was a Swiss developmental biologist. He developed techniques for imaginal disc transplantation in Drosophila, leading to technique for the production of fate maps, and studied the organization of mature discs. He discovered the phenomenon of transdetermination. Hadorn was noted for both his experimental skills and teaching.

Hadorn was born in the family of farmers in Forst in Bernese Oberland. Even as a child he was interested in the development of frogs from their eggs each summer. He worked as a teacher in a local village and earned enough money to study biology at the University of Berne under Fritz Baltzer studying nuclear-cytoplasmic interactions. He received a PhD in 1931 and began to teach graduate students. He began to conduct research in his basement on amphibia and with Baltzer's encouragement he applied for a Rockefeller fellowship and went to University of Rochester and met Curt Sturn and began to work with Drosophila. He returned to Switzerland and later joined the University of Zurich where he worked until 1972. His research included mechanisms of gene expression and regulation, especially with experiments on mosaic genomes, with the experimental introduction of a foreign genome into a cell. One of his experiments was on the mutant Drosophila that had larvae that did not turn into pupae due to a defective hormone function. In 1955 he published Developmental Genetics and Lethal Factors which was translated to English in 1961. This earned him the Marcel Benoist Prize. His other major work was on imaginal discs begun in 1945 and he worked out the fate of different regions producing "fate maps" using experiments with transplanting tissues and studying transdetermination.

Hadorn was known for his enthusiasm in teaching and conducted intense workshops. In his spare time he took an interest in birdwatching and fishing. Hadorn was one of the founders of the journal Developmental Biology. He died at Wohlen near Bern.
