= Beat Fierz =

Swiss chemist and molecular biologist

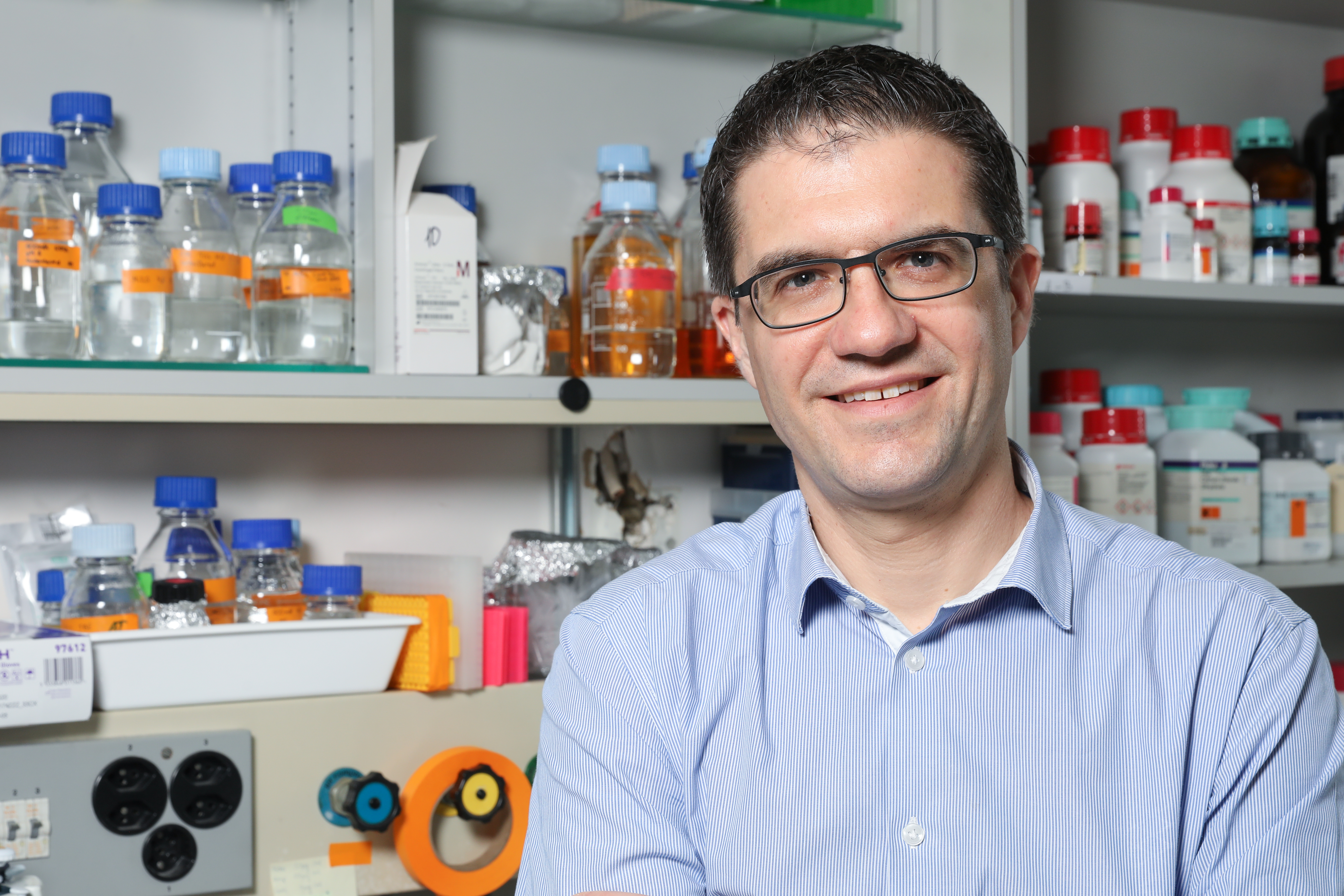
- Beat Fierz in 2021
- Born: August 25, 1978 (age 48); Basel, Switzerland
- Citizenship: Swiss

Academic background
- Education: Molecular Biology
- Alma mater: University of Basel
- Doctoral advisor: Thomas Kiefhaber
- Other advisor: Tom W. Muir

Academic work
- Discipline: Biophysical chemistry
- Institutions: EPFL (École Polytechnique Fédérale de Lausanne)
- Main interests: Chromatin
- Website: https://www.epfl.ch/labs/lcbm/

Beat Fierz (born August 25, 1978 in Basel, Switzerland) is a Swiss chemist and molecular biologist, currently an associate professor at the EPFL (École Polytechnique Fédérale de Lausanne). His research is focused on understanding dynamic processes of large molecular systems, particularly in chromatin regulation.

== Career ==
Beat Fierz studied molecular biology and biophysical chemistry at the Biozentrum of the University of Basel. After the diploma in 2002, he joined the laboratory of Thomas Kiefhaber at the Biozentrum for a PhD in protein folding and dynamics. There, he used nanosecond laser photolysis to observe initial steps in protein folding and secondary structure formation. After obtaining his PhD in 2006, he moved to Rockefeller University to pursue postdoctoral research. Working in the laboratory of Tom W. Muir, he developed methods to synthesize chromatin containing defined ubiquitin modifications. In 2012, he was appointed tenure track assistant professor for the Sandoz Foundation Chair at the Institute of Chemical Sciences and Engineering of EPFL. There, he established a program to detect dynamic processes in chromatin regulation, combining chemical biology and biophysics methods. In 2019, he was promoted to associate professor at EPFL.

== Research ==
As a postdoctoral researcher, Beat Fierz contributed to the understanding that chromatin ubiquitylation opens chromatin structure, increasing local chromatin accessibility.

Beat Fierz currently heads the Laboratory of Biophysical Chemistry of Macromolecules (LCBM) at the School of Basic Sciences at EPFL. The LCBM is focused on obtaining a quantitative understanding of chromatin systems from a dynamic perspective. The laboratory develops chemical protein synthesis methods to generate and analyze modified chromatin. Building on chemically defined systems, the LCBM has also developed single-molecule fluorescence methods to reveal chromatin dynamics, in particular structural motions in chromatin fibers, as well as dynamic interactions of chromatin regulatory proteins. Research performed in Beat Fierz's laboratory has also helped elucidating key steps in gene repression via heterochromatin or PRC2. These methodologies can also be applied for the study of DNA sensors such as cGAS, as well as gene regulation via transcription factors. Beat Fierz is involved in several large projects, including a Swiss National Science Foundation Sinergia project, called ImmuNet, aiming to decode the tubulin PTM code in immune cells. Moreover, he serves as a co-director of the ongoing NCCR application PRODIGY, for AI-driven drug development.

== Recognition ==
Beat Fierz was awarded a Consolidator Grant from the European Research Council in 2017, for the project "Chromo-SUMMIT", aiming to decode dynamic chromatin signaling by single-molecule multiplex detection.

In 2023, he was awarded a SNSF Advanced grant by the Swiss National Science Foundation for the project "Site-Specific Access of Regulatory Chromatin in Cells (siteSearch)", to image transcription factor dynamics in cells.

He is a member of the Biophysical Society, the Swiss Chemical Society and the Vice-President for the Life Sciences Switzerland (LS2) Section Biophysics.

== Key publications ==
- Kilic, Sinan; Felekyan, Suren; Doroshenko, Olga; Boichenko, Iuliia; Dimura, Mykola; Vardanyan, Hayk; Bryan, Louise C.; Arya, Gaurav; Seidel, Claus A. M.; Fierz, Beat (2018). "Single-molecule FRET reveals multiscale chromatin dynamics modulated by HP1α". Nature Communications. 9 (1): 235. Bibcode:2018NatCo...9..235K. doi:10.1038/s41467-017-02619-5. PMC 5770380. PMID 29339721.
- Kilic, Sinan; Bachmann, Andreas L.; Bryan, Louise C.; Fierz, Beat (2015). "Multivalency governs HP1α association dynamics with the silent chromatin state". Nature Communications. 6: 7313. Bibcode:2015NatCo...6.7313K. doi:10.1038/ncomms8313. PMC 4557296. PMID 26084584.
- Fierz, Beat; Chatterjee, Champak; McGinty, Robert K.; Bar-Dagan, Maya; Raleigh, Daniel P.; Muir, Tom W. (2011). "Histone H2B ubiquitylation disrupts local and higher-order chromatin compaction". Nature Chemical Biology. 7 (2): 113–119. doi:10.1038/nchembio.501. PMC 3078768. PMID 21196936.
