= Marcel Benoist Prize =

- Prix Marcel Benoist
- Awarded for: Useful scientific discovery
- Sponsored by: Marcel Benoist Foundation
- Country: Switzerland
- First award: 1920; 106 years ago
- Website: marcel-benoist.ch/en/

The Marcel Benoist Prize, offered by the Marcel Benoist Foundation, is a monetary prize that has been offered annually since 1920 to a scientist of Swiss nationality or residency who has made the most useful scientific discovery. Emphasis is placed on those discoveries affecting human life. Since 1997, candidates in the humanities have also been eligible for the prize.

The Marcel Benoist Foundation was established by the will of the French lawyer Marcel Benoist, a wartime resident of Lausanne, who died in 1918. It is managed by a group of trustees comprising the Swiss interior minister and heads of the main Swiss universities. It has been dubbed the "Swiss Nobel Prize."

== History ==
The first award was given to immunologist Maurice Arthus (1862–1945) at the University of Lausanne. Other winners have included computer scientist Niklaus Wirth, astronomer Michel Mayor, and cardiologist Max Holzmann. As of 2019, eleven Marcel Benoist winners have later also won the Nobel Prize: Paul Karrer, Leopold Ruzicka, Walter R. Hess, Tadeus Reichstein, Vladimir Prelog, Niels Kaj Jerne, Johannes G. Bednorz, Karl. Alexander Müller, Richard R. Ernst, Kurz Wüthrich, and Michel Mayor.

In 2009, Françoise Gisou van der Goot (École polytechnique fédérale de Lausanne) was the first woman to win the Marcel Benoist Prize.

== Laureates ==
- 1920: Maurice Arthus
- 1921: Conrad Brunner
- 1922: Paul Karrer
- 1923: Albert Heim
- 1924: Heinrich Zangger
- 1925: Alfred Gysi
- 1926: Emile Argand
- 1927: Hermann Sahli
- 1928: Jules Gonin
- 1929: Paul Niggli
- 1930: Aloys Müller
- 1931: Walter R. Hess
- 1932: Maurice Lugeon
- 1933: Robert Doerr
- 1934: Max Askanazy
- 1935: Jakob Eugster
- 1936: Alfredo Vannotti
- 1937: Charles Dhéré
- 1938: Leopold Ruzicka
- 1939: Fritz Baltzer
- 1940: Friedrich T. Wahlen
- 1941: Hermann Mooser
- 1942: Arthur Stoll
- 1943: Paul Scherrer
- 1944: Robert Matthey
- 1945: Ernst Albert Gäumann
- 1946: Alexander von Muralt
- 1947: Tadeus Reichstein
- 1948: Hans E. Walther
- 1949: Albert Frey-Wyssling
- 1950: Emile Guyénot
- 1951: Anton Fonio
- 1952: Otto Gsell
- 1953: Alfred Fleisch
- 1954: Ernst Hadorn
- 1955: Max Holzmann
- 1956: Siegfried Rosin
- 1957: Jakob Seiler
- 1958: Klaus Clusius
- 1959: Albert Wettstein
- 1960: Pierre Duchosal
- 1961: Werner Kuhn
- 1962: Alfred Hässig
- 1963: Gerold Schwarzenbach
- 1964: Vladimir Prelog
- 1965: Georges de Rham
- 1966: Edouard Kellenberger and Alfred Tissières
- 1967: Kurt Mühlethaler and Hans J. Moor
- 1968: Michel Dolivo
- 1969: Walter Heitler
- 1970: Charles Weissmann
- 1971: Manfred Bleuler
- 1972: Albert Eschenmoser
- 1973: Lucien Girardier, Eric Jéquier and Georges Spinnler
- 1974: Ewald Weibel
- 1975: M. Gazi Yasargil
- 1976: Theodor K. Brunner, Jean Charles Cerottini and Jean Lindenmann
- 1977: Hans Günthard and Edgar Heilbronner
- 1978: Niels Kaj Jerne
- 1979: Michel Cuénod
- 1980: Hans Kummer
- 1981: Karl Illmensee
- 1982: Franz Fankhauser
- 1983: Hans R. Brunner
- 1984: Harald Reuter
- 1985: Richard R. Ernst
- 1986: Johannes G. Bednorz and Karl Alexander Müller
- 1987: Maurice E. Müller, Martin Allgöwer and Hans R. Willenegger
- 1988: Ulrich Laemmli
- 1989: Niklaus Wirth
- 1990: Bruno Messerli, Hans Oeschger and Werner Stumm
- 1991: Duilio Arigoni and Kurt Wüthrich
- 1992: Gottfried Schatz
- 1993: no prize
- 1994: Martin Schwab
- 1995: Henri Isliker and Alfred Pletscher
- 1996: Bernard Rossier
- 1997: Jürg M. Fröhlich
- 1998: Michel Mayor
- 1999: Jörg Paul Müller and Luzius Wildhaber
- 2000: Dieter Seebach
- 2001: Ruedi Imbach
- 2002: Rüdiger Wehner
- 2003: Denis Duboule
- 2004: Adriano Aguzzi
- 2005: Othmar Keel
- 2006: Timothy J. Richmond
- 2007: Ari Helenius
- 2008: Ernst Fehr
- 2009: Françoise Gisou van der Goot (first time that the prize is awarded to a woman)
- 2010: Daniel Loss
- 2011: Michele Parrinello
- 2012: Michael N. Hall
- 2013: Michael Grätzel
- 2014: Nicolas Gisin
- 2015: Laurent Keller
- 2016: Johan Auwerx
- 2017: Thomas Stocker
- 2018: Lars-Erik Cederman
- 2019: Nicola Spaldin
- 2020: Rudolf Aebersold
- 2021: Thomas Berger
- 2022: Ursula Keller
- 2023: Ted Turlings
- 2024: Pascal Gygax
- 2025: Tobias J. Kippenberg
- 2026: Martin Jinek

== See also ==
- List of general science and technology awards
- Science and technology in Switzerland
- Prizes named after people
- Latsis Foundation
- Louis-Jeantet Prize for Medicine
