= Lucien Girardier =

Swiss physiologist (1929–2024)

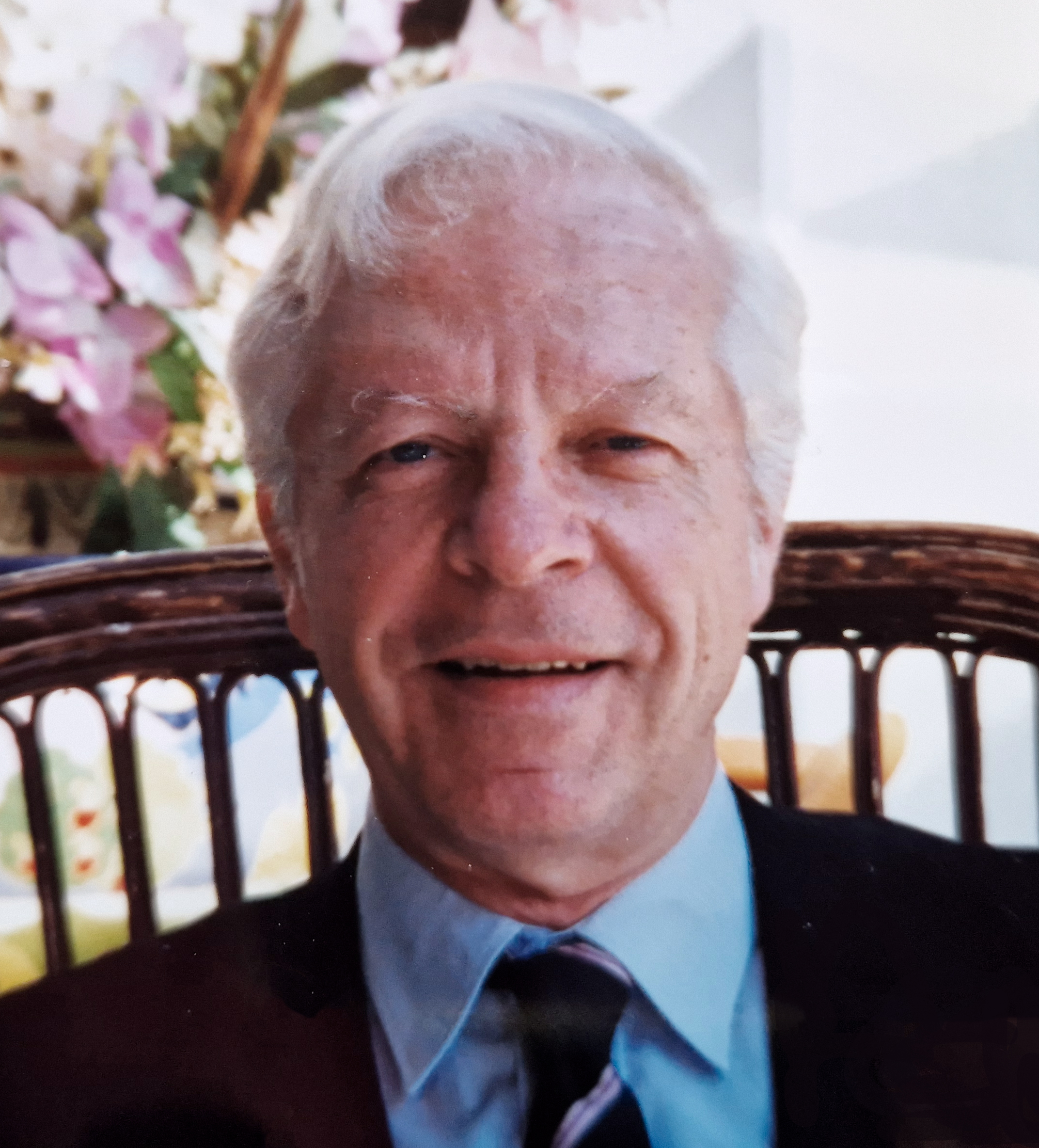
- Born: December 29, 1929; La Chaux-de-Fonds, Switzerland
- Died: April 14, 2024 (aged 94)
- Education: University of Neuchâtel; University of Geneva
- Occupations: Physiologist, academic
- Spouse: Ginette Vuilleumier

Lucien Girardier (29 December 1929 – 14 April 2024) was a Swiss physiologist and professor at the University of Geneva, known for his research in bioenergetics, bioelectricity, endocrinology, and calorimetry. He was awarded the Marcel Benoist Prize in 1973.

== Life and career ==
Girardier was born on 29 December 1929 in La Chaux-de-Fonds, into a Protestant family. His father, Marcel Henri Girardier, was a forest warden. He later married Ginette Vuilleumier, from Tramelan and La Sagne. He died on 14 April 2024.

He studied medicine at the University of Neuchâtel and the University of Geneva, obtaining his federal diploma in 1957 and his doctorate in 1959. He subsequently conducted research at Columbia University in New York in 1960 and at the Marine Biological Laboratory in Woods Hole, Massachusetts in 1961.

He was appointed assistant professor of physiology at the Faculty of Medicine of the University of Geneva in 1967, then associate professor in 1970, full professor in 1973, and honorary professor in 1995. His teaching and research spanned bioenergetics, bioelectricity, endocrinology, metabolism, cardiac electrogenesis, and neurogenic control of glycemia.

In 1973, he was awarded the Marcel Benoist Prize for his work on direct micro- and macro-calorimetry and its application to human pathophysiology and fundamental research.

== Bibliography ==
- Recueil des professeurs de l'université de Genève, 1990.
- M. Stuber, S. Kraut, Le prix Marcel Benoist de 1920 à 1995, 1995.
