= Max Holzmann =

Swiss cardiologist (1899–1994)

- Born: 31 March 1899; Zürich, Switzerland
- Died: 27 January 1994 (aged 94); Zürich, Switzerland
- Occupation: Cardiologist
- Awards: Marcel Benoist Prize (1955)

Max Holzmann (31 March 1899 – 27 January 1994) was a Swiss cardiologist.

== Early life ==
Max Holzmann was born on 31 March 1899 in Zürich, the son of physician Moritz Holzmann and Anna Helena Lerch. Holzmann took a degree in medicine in Zurich and Lausanne, and in 1923 graduated with a doctor of medicine degree. Holzmann worked as a doctor in Vienna, Paris and at the University Hospital in Zürich.

Holzmann taught from 1959 to 1969 as a lecturer and honorary professor at the University of Zurich. He also acted in 1948 as co-founder of the Swiss Society of Cardiology, of which he was president from 1952 to 1955.

== Personal life ==
In 1931, Holzmann married Elisa, daughter of Emil Rüegg, in Zürich. He died on 27 January 1994 in Zürich, aged 94.

== Publications ==
Holzmann published over a hundred papers on radiology and electrocardiography.

- Clinical Electrocardiography (textbook), 1945–1965, 5th edition

== Honours ==
- 1955, Marcel Benoist Prize awarded, for his textbook and his life's work
