= Gabriel Bucelin =

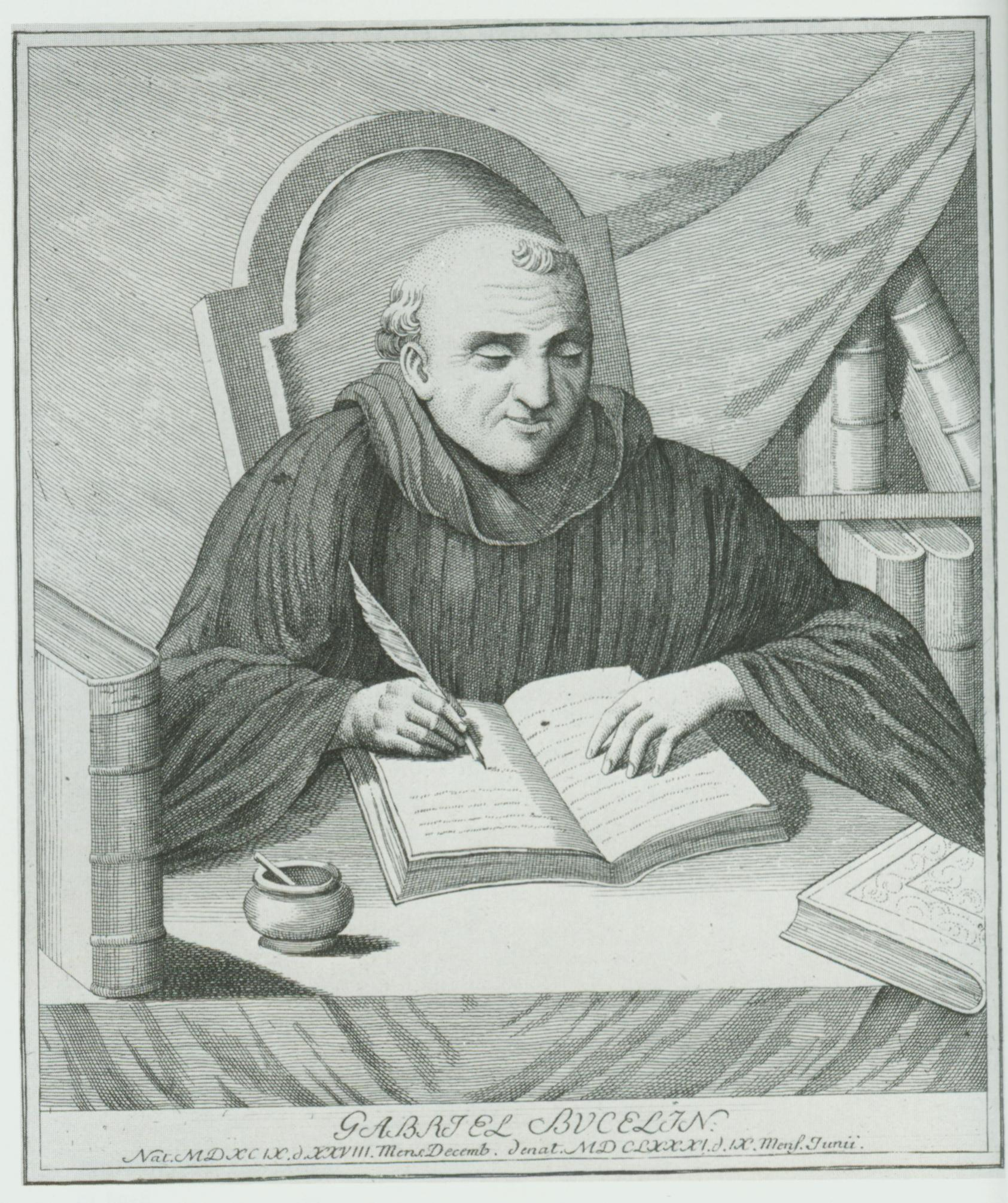
- Born: 29 December 1599; Diessenhofen, Thurgau
- Died: 9 June 1681 (aged 81); Weingarten
- Other names: Gabriel Buzlin, Gabriel Bincelint, Gabriel Bucelinus
- Occupations: Benedictine polymath, Humanist, historical writer, cartographer

Gabriel Bucelin (also Gabriel Buzlin, Gabriel Bincelint, or Gabriel Bucelinus) (29 December 1599 – 9 June 1681) was a Benedictine polymath, Humanist, historical writer and cartographer.

== Life ==
A scion of the distinguished line of Bucellini counts, Gabriel, at the age of thirteen, entered the Benedictine monastery at Weingarten. After a course in philosophy and theology at the Jesuit University of Dillingen he was ordained a priest on April 23, 1624. In the same year he was sent, as master of novices, to restore the primitive fervour and raise the standard of studies in the monastery of St. Trudpert in the Black Forest. In 1627 he became secretary to Abbott Franz Dietrich and to the Swabian Benedictine congregation. He filled the position of master of novices at Weingarten and professor of humanities at Feldkirch (1635), from which on the approach of the Swedish army he was forced to flee to Vienna, Venice, and finally Admont (1646). There he was appointed prior of St. John's monastery, Feldkirch (1651), where he remained until a few months before his death, when he returned to Weingarten.

== Works ==
Bucelin was a universal scholar and a very prolific writer, being the author of some fifty-three works on genealogy, world history, hagiography and church history. He also drew maps and plans. A large number of his works are still in manuscript in the state library at Stuttgart. Many of his works remained unpublished, perhaps because of the disruptions of war. His chief claim to contemporary fame lies in the fact that he was, if not the first, at least among the first authors to deal with the ecclesiastical history of Germany. Of his published works the most important are:

- Germania sacra (Augsburg, 1655), containing accounts of the principal ecclesiastics, archbishops, abbots, etc., as well as a list of the most important monasteries of Germany
- Germania topo-chrono-stemmato-Graphica sacra et profana (1655–78), treating, as its name implies, of the genealogy of the most distinguished members of the clergy and the nobility
- Constantia sacra et profana (Frankfort, 1667)
- Rhaetia etrusca, romana, gallica, germanica (Augsburg, 1661)
- Nuclei Historiae universalis cum sacrae... (Ulm, 1650, 1654; carried from 1650 to 1735 by Schmier, Apparatum ad theologiam scholastico-polemico-practicam), of great importance to scholars interested in ancient charts, bulls, diplomata, etc.

Bucelin was also the author of many works on the Benedictine Order and its most illustrious members, among them Aquila imperii benedictina (Venice, 1651), Annales Benedictini (Vienna 1655, Augsburg 1656) and Menologium benedictinum (Feldkirch, 1655).
