= Jean Gruenberg =

Swiss biologist

Professor Jean Gruenberg
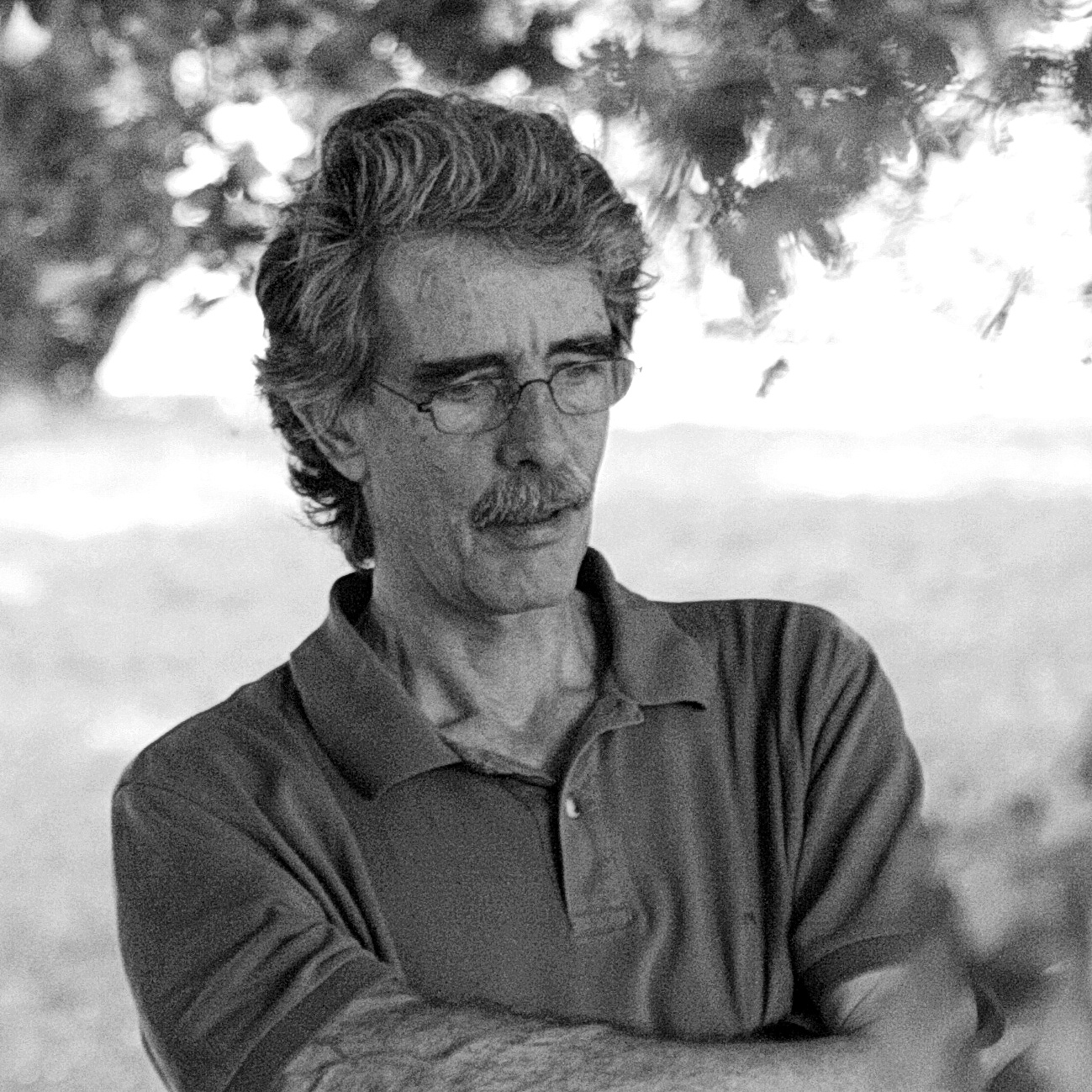
- Gruenberg in 2007
- Born: 13 April 1950 (age 76)
- Spouse: Gisou van der Goot
- Relatives: Carl Grünberg (grandfather)

Academic work
- Discipline: Cell Biology
- Sub-discipline: Intracellular Trafficking

Jean Gruenberg (born April 13, 1950) is a Swiss biologist, and a professor at the University of Geneva. His research in the fields of cell biology and biochemistry has significantly contributed to a better understanding of the molecular mechanisms involved in the intracellular traffic within eukaryotic cells, more especially in the endolysosomal pathway.

Using innovative approaches such as phospholipid-specific antibodies and reconstituted cell-free systems, Jean Gruenberg and his colleagues were able to unravel several important mechanisms regulating the biogenesis and membrane dynamics of early and late endosomal compartments.

== Biography ==
Jean Gruenberg was born in Switzerland in 1950. Jean Gruenberg is married to Françoise Gisou van der Goot, and they have two children Anouk and Sébastien.1950. Jean Gruenberg and his family reside in Trélex Switzerland and he works at the University of Geneva as an emeritus professor in the Department of Biochemistry.

== Scientific achievements ==
=== Cell-free reconstitution of endosomal fission and fusion events ===
After early studies on parasites (T. brucei and P. falciparum), Jean Gruenberg switched focus and studied the dynamics endosomal processes when he started to work at the European Molecular Biology Laboratory (EMBL) with Kate Howell, and made several important discoveries on the molecular factors directing endosome dynamics, and was successful in reconstituting the process in vitro. When he became an independent investigator, first at the EMBL and then at the University of Geneva, he continued this line of research and worked on the characterization of early and late endosomes, and identified a transport intermediate between these organelles known as the ECVs/MVBs (Early Carrier Vesicles / MultiVesicular Bodies).

=== Molecular mechanisms of endosomal biogenesis and membrane dynamics ===
Throughout his career, Jean Gruenberg and his colleagues identified several molecular factors directing endosomal biogenesis and dynamics, including various cytoskeleton-associated proteins, the small GTPases Rab5 and Rab7, Annexin A2 (previously named Annexin II), the vacuolar ATPase, COP coat proteins, the N-ethylmaleimide sensitive factor, the small transmembrane proteins of the p24 family, the p38 MAP kinase, phosphatidylinositol-3-phosphate, intra-endosomal cholesterol, the redox sensor thioredoxin-like protein, sorting nexins, the adaptor protein complex AP1, components of ESCRTs and associated proteins and the atypical phospholipid LBPA/BMP (see next section).

Using the Vesicular Stomatitis Virus (VSV) as a "hijacker" of the endocytic pathway, Jean Gruenberg and his colleagues demonstrated that intralumenal vesicles present within multivesicular endosomes are able to undergo back-fusion with the limiting membrane of these organelles, thus releasing their content into the cytoplasm, a process regulated by the ESCRT-related proteins TSG101 and ALIX, and since shown to be exploited by various other invaders of the cells such as the Anthrax toxin, and several other viruses.

=== Characterization of lysobisphosphatidic acid using anti-phospholipid antibodies ===
A milestone discovery in the career of Jean Gruenberg was the identification and the characterization of an atypical inverted cone-shaped phospholipid, originally named lysobisphosphatidic acid (LBPA) and also known as bis(monoacylglycero)phosphate (BMP). Using specific monoclonal antibodies, LBPA/BMP was shown to be enriched in intralumenal vesicles of late endosomes and to regulate the intracellular transport and homeostasis of cholesterol. LBPA/BMP is also directly involved in the formation of intracellular vesicles within multivesicular endosomes and endosome-mimicking liposomes.

== See also ==
- University of Geneva
- Life Sciences Switzerland
- European Molecular Biology Laboratory
- Endosome
- ESCRT
- Lysosomal storage disease
- Vesicular stomatitis virus
