= Diessenhofen =

- Municipality
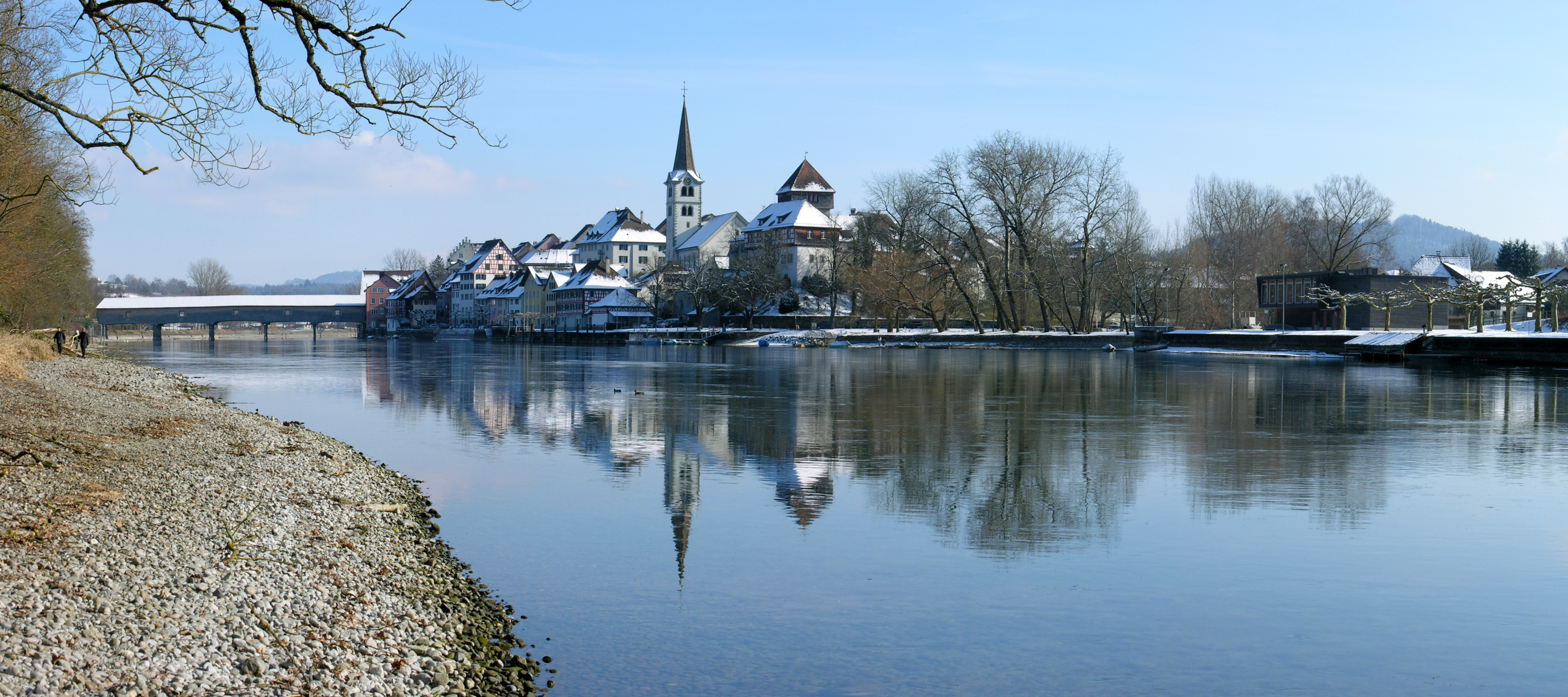

- Coat of arms
- Location of Diessenhofen
- Location within Switzerland Location within Canton of Thurgau
- Coordinates: 47°41′N 8°45′E
- Country: Switzerland
- Canton: Thurgau
- District: Frauenfeld

Area
  - Total: 10.12 km^{2} (3.91 sq mi)
- Elevation: 398 m (1,306 ft)

Population (December 2007)
  - Total: 3,160
  - Density: 312/km^{2} (809/sq mi)
- Time zone: UTC+01:00 (CET)
  - Summer (DST): UTC+02:00 (CEST)
- Postal code: 8253
- SFOS number: 4545
- ISO 3166 code: CH-TG
- Localities: Willisdorf
- Surrounded by: Schlatt (TG), Basadingen-Schlattingen
- Website: www.diessenhofen.ch

Diessenhofen (German pronunciation: [diːsn̩ˈhoːfn̩]) is a village and a municipality in Frauenfeld District in the canton of Thurgau in Switzerland. The village is situated on the south shore of the High Rhine just opposite the German town of Gailingen am Hochrhein.

== History ==
Diessenhofen is first mentioned in 757 as Deozincova. In 2000, the village of Willisdorf was incorporated into the municipality. The earliest traces of a settlement are Stone and Bronze Age scattered objects found in the shallow valleys of the district and on the banks of the Rhine. A hoard of coins from the Roman era (251–270), and the remains of three towers of the Danube-Iller-Rhein limes (4th century) show Roman settlements in the area. The reference in a deed of the Abbey of St. Gall from 757 mention an Alamanni village, which was probably on the plateau south of the church. In 1178 Count Hartmann III of Kyburg, raised the village to town and probably appointed a Ministerialis (unfree knights in the service of a feudal overlord) family as the Stewards of Diessenhofen. By 1245, at the latest, it was the center of a bailiwick and a castle was built in town. Compared to Schaffhausen and Stein am Rhein, Diessenhofen was a modest market town. Hartmann granted the town a measure of freedom and self-government. He used the castle and bridge over the Rhine to secure and defend his possessions on both sides of the Rhine. After the extinction of the Kyburgs and the transition of sovereignty to the Habsburgs in 1264, the city developed as one of the cornerstones of the region. The Stewards, who sat at Unterhof Castle, temporarily united both the Vogt and Schultheiss offices into a single person. By 1320 the citizens chose a Town Council of 8–12 members, and during the 15th century this evolved into a 24–28 member Grand Town Council. In 1349, the Duke of Austria wrestled the Vogt office away from the Stewards and granted it to another Ministerialis. These two developments made citizenship rights in Diessenhofen increasingly important.

The loss of Habsburg influence and the decline of the Habsburg supported Stewards gradually transformed the city between 1415 and 1442. Diessenhofen was captured in 1460 during the conquest of Thurgau by the Swiss Confederation. The town was besieged for ten days before it was captured, but, much like Frauenfeld, it retained certain privileges in the new Thurgau. These included both the high and low courts and the recently acquired customs, tax and Vogt rights, as well as the castle. After 1574 they also acquired the rights over the left bank of the Rhine and the possessions of Paradise Monastery. During the 16th century, the town gained the low court rights over most of the modern Diessenhofen District. Diessenhofen's court decisions did not have to be approved by the Governor in Frauenfeld, but went directly to the Confederation Council, in contrast to the rest of Thurgau. The city only had to pay homage to the Governor every two years.

The patronage of the church of St. Dionysius is mentioned in 1468. The advowson right in the 12th century was included in the possession of the Count of Thurgau. By 1230 it was held by the Kyburgs. In 1264, the city government through the Habsburgs had the right. Practically, the citizens exercised the right after 1383 and it was legally confirmed in 1415. When the Protestant Reformation entered the town in 1524, many citizens converted to the new religion. The Mass was abolished in 1529 by the Protestant pastor, who also ordered the confiscation of Catholic Church property. Diessenhofen supported the city of Zurich in the Second War of Kappel in 1531, which ended in a Protestant defeat. After the defeat, the Catholic cantons reintroduced the Mass in 1532. The church remained a shared church until the construction of the Catholic Church in 1966–67. In 1349 the Jewish community of Diessenhofen was driven out of town. In 1401 a Jewish man was successfully, but falsely, prosecuted for ritual murder, which led to further persecution in Winterthur and Schaffhausen. During the 13th century, two Nunneries were built between Diessenhofen and Schaffhausen, St. Katharinental and Paradise, which remained in operation until their dissolution in the 19th century.

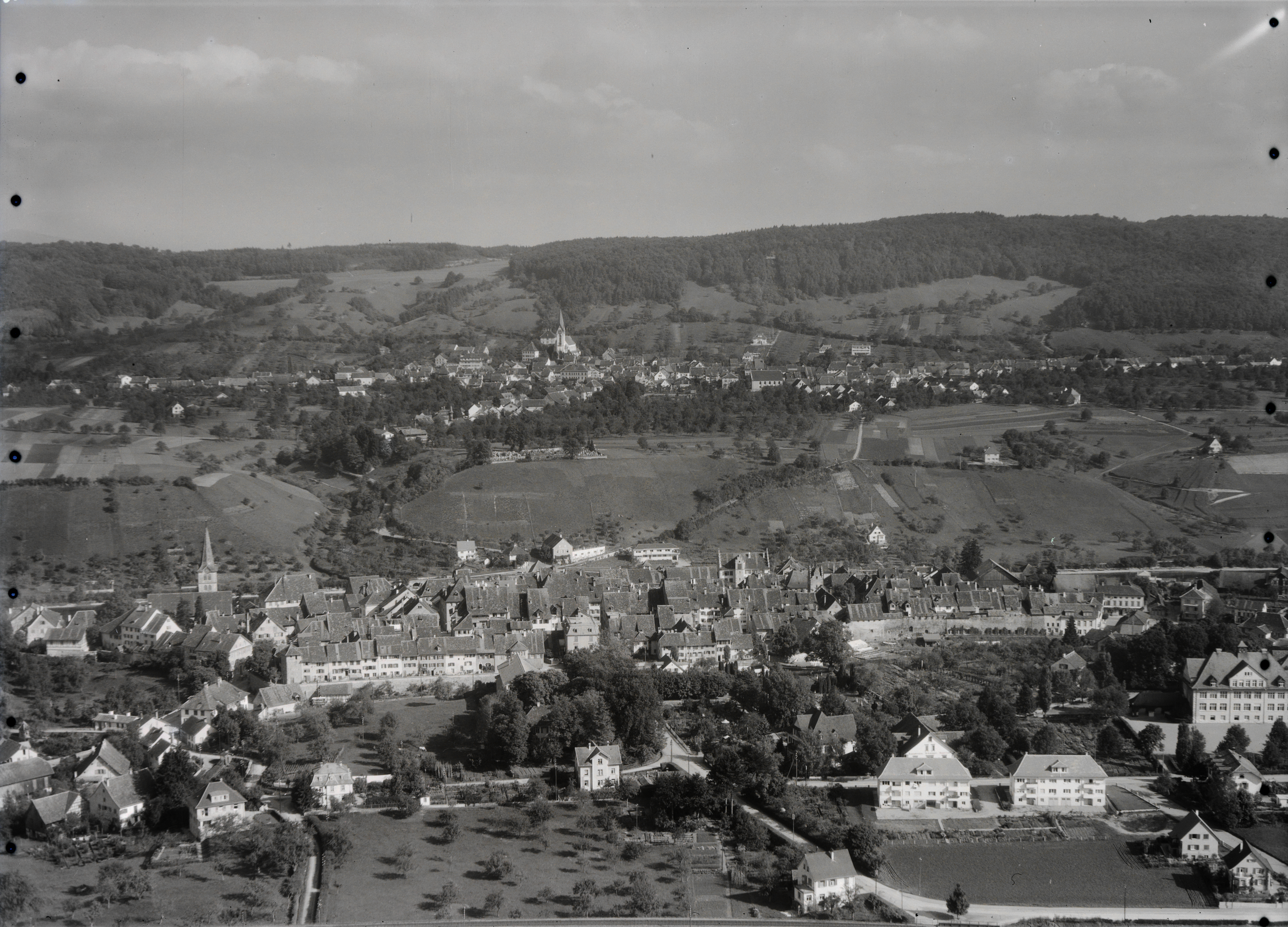
Aerial view by Walter Mittelholzer (1935)

Since the Early Middle Ages the district has been known as the granary of the Thurgau due to its extensive and productive grain fields. Additionally, already in the 9th century widespread viticulture is mentioned in the Upper Rhine region. Until the 19th century, the city was largely self-supplied for food and served as a collection point for food heading from the farms to the surrounding cities (especially Schaffhausen and Zurich). In the 12th century are a weekly markets in town. Starting in 1387 two yearly markets opened and by the 19th century that it had increased to eight yearly markets. The local industry covered only the simplest needs of the city and its limited market area. The limited industry and area provided too little money to support the formation of trade-oriented guilds. Diessenhofen was never dominated by a single industry or a special craft. It never was involved in the international Lake Constance trade industry. The town's location on the Rhine favored the development of fisheries, and it benefited from the salt trade. Bridge and transit tariffs provided the majority of the town's income until the abolition of internal tariffs in 1848.

== Geography ==
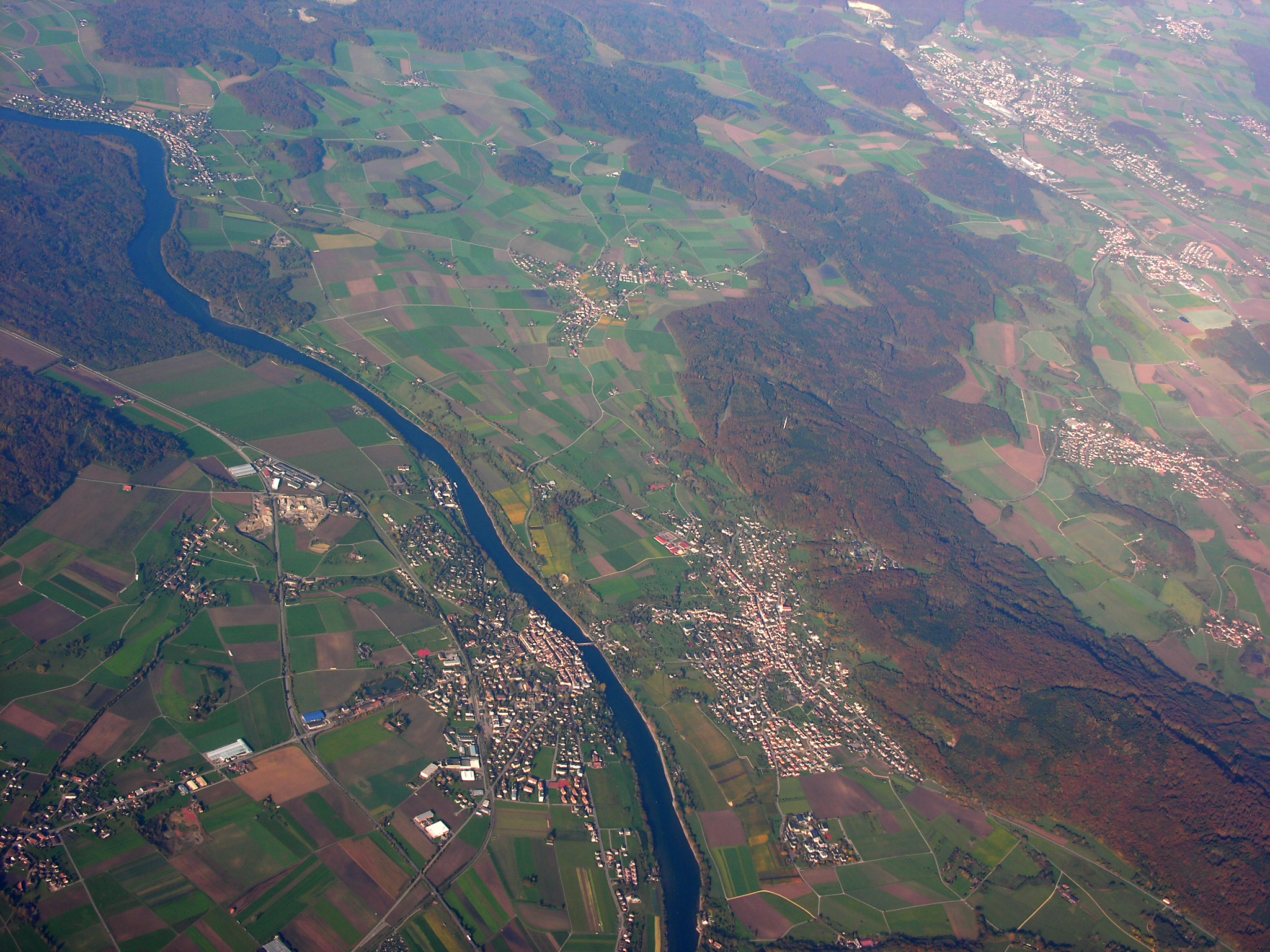
Aerial view of Diessenhofen on the left side of the Rhine

Diessenhofen has an area, as of 2009, of 10.12 square kilometers (3.91 sq mi). Of this area, 4.24 km^{2} (1.64 sq mi) or 41.9% is used for agricultural purposes, while 3.67 km^{2} (1.42 sq mi) or 36.3% is forested. Of the rest of the land, 1.62 km^{2} (0.63 sq mi) or 16.0% is settled (buildings or roads), 0.51 km^{2} (0.20 sq mi) or 5.0% is either rivers or lakes.

Of the built up area, industrial buildings made up 5.3% of the total area while housing and buildings made up 1.8% and transportation infrastructure made up 1.8%. Power and water infrastructure as well as other special developed areas made up 1.3% of the area while parks, green belts and sports fields made up 5.8%. Out of the forested land, 33.9% of the total land area is heavily forested and 2.4% is covered with orchards or small clusters of trees. Of the agricultural land, 40.9% is used for growing crops. All the water in the municipality is flowing water.

The municipality borders on north with Germany and the canton of Schaffhausen. On the east is the district of Steckborn, on the west the municipality of Schlatt, and on the south the municipality of Basadingen-Schlattingen.

Germany
Canton of Schaffhausen
Germany
Schlatt TG

Steckborn District
Schlatt
Basadingen-Schlattingen
Basadingen-Schlattingen

== Demographics ==
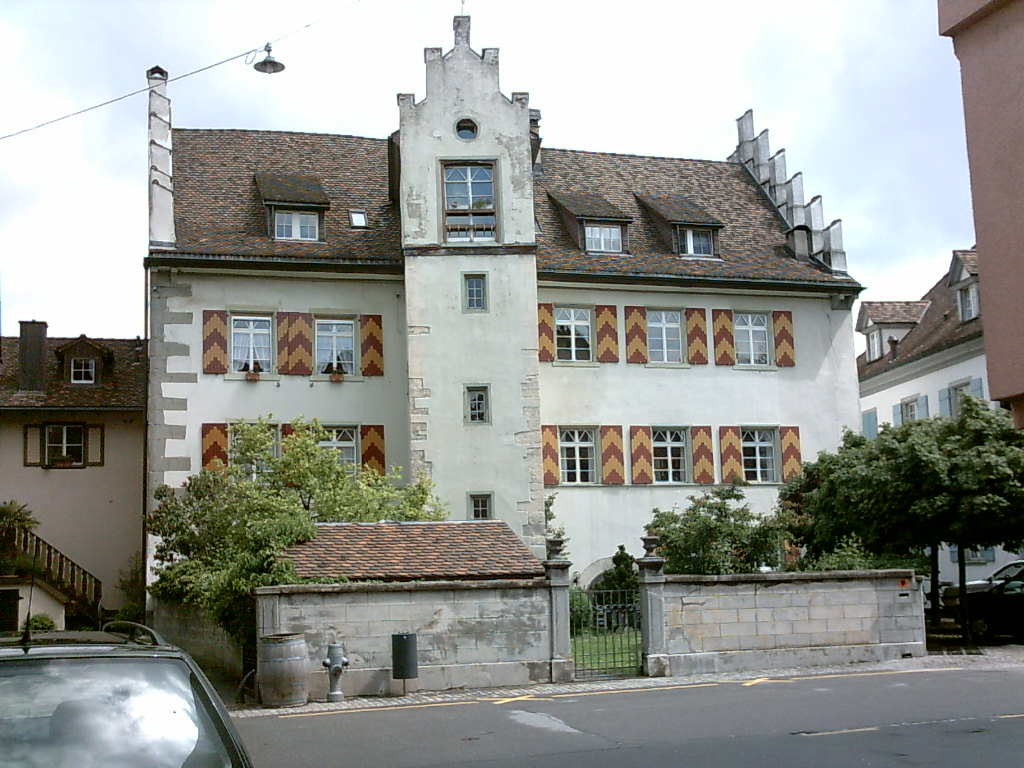
Oberhof in Diessenhofen

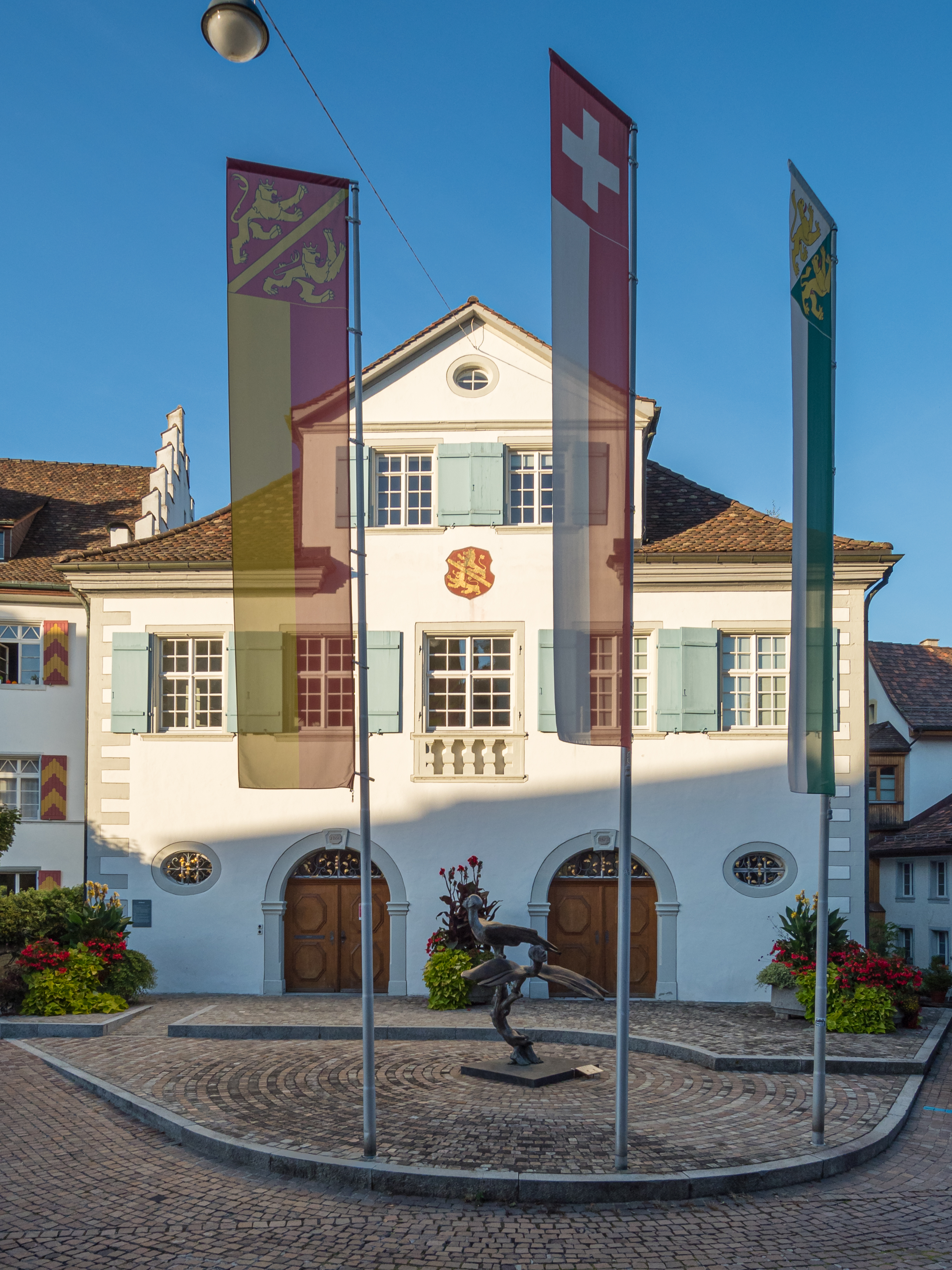
Town hall

Diessenhofen has a population (as of December 2020) of 4,085. As of 2008, 30.7% of the population are foreign nationals. Over the last 10 years (1997–2007) the population has changed at a rate of 1.5%. Most of the population (as of 2000) speaks German(81.8%), with Italian being second most common ( 5.2%) and Albanian being third ( 3.9%).

As of 2008, the gender distribution of the population was 50.7% male and 49.3% female. The population was made up of 1,088 Swiss men (33.4% of the population), and 564 (17.3%) non-Swiss men. There were 1,171 Swiss women (35.9%), and 437 (13.4%) non-Swiss women.

In 2008 there were 23 live births to Swiss citizens and 14 births to non-Swiss citizens, and in same time span there were 17 deaths of Swiss citizens and 3 non-Swiss citizen deaths. Ignoring immigration and emigration, the population of Swiss citizens increased by 6 while the foreign population increased by 11. There were 4 Swiss men who emigrated from Switzerland to another country, 2 Swiss women who emigrated from Switzerland to another country, 34 non-Swiss men who emigrated from Switzerland to another country and 28 non-Swiss women who emigrated from Switzerland to another country. The total Swiss population change in 2008 (from all sources) was an increase of 25 and the non-Swiss population change was an increase of 32 people. This represents a population growth rate of 1.8%.

The age distribution, as of 2009, in Diessenhofen is; 297 children or 9.0% of the population are between 0 and 9 years old and 384 teenagers or 11.6% are between 10 and 19. Of the adult population, 430 people or 13.0% of the population are between 20 and 29 years old. 460 people or 13.9% are between 30 and 39, 516 people or 15.6% are between 40 and 49, and 472 people or 14.2% are between 50 and 59. The senior population distribution is 418 people or 12.6% of the population are between 60 and 69 years old, 224 people or 6.8% are between 70 and 79, there are 99 people or 3.0% who are between 80 and 89, and there are 14 people or 0.4% who are 90 and older.

As of 2000, there were 1,325 private households in the municipality, and an average of 2.4 persons per household. In 2000 there were 338 single family homes (or 67.1% of the total) out of a total of 504 inhabited buildings. There were 46 two family buildings (9.1%), 36 three family buildings (7.1%) and 84 multi-family buildings (or 16.7%). There were 732 (or 22.7%) persons who were part of a couple without children, and 1,722 (or 53.4%) who were part of a couple with children. There were 175 (or 5.4%) people who lived in single parent home, while there are 6 persons who were adult children living with one or both parents, 9 persons who lived in a household made up of relatives, 23 who lived in a household made up of unrelated persons, and 107 who are either institutionalized or live in another type of collective housing.

The vacancy rate for the municipality, in 2008, was 1.72%. As of 2007, the construction rate of new housing units was 0.6 new units per 1000 residents. In 2000 there were 1,528 apartments in the municipality. The most common apartment size was the 4 room apartment of which there were 471. There were 88 single room apartments and 162 apartments with six or more rooms. As of 2000 the average price to rent an average apartment in Diessenhofen was 900.07 Swiss francs (CHF) per month (US$720, £410, €580 approx. exchange rate from 2000). The average rate for a one-room apartment was 649.00 CHF (US$520, £290, €420), a two-room apartment was about 628.34 CHF (US$500, £280, €400), a three-room apartment was about 788.98 CHF (US$630, £360, €500) and a six or more room apartment cost an average of 1614.00 CHF (US$1290, £730, €1030). The average apartment price in Diessenhofen was 80.7% of the national average of 1116 CHF.

In the 2007 federal election the most popular party was the SVP which received 43.96% of the vote. The next three most popular parties were the SP (16.98%), the CVP (12.61%) and the FDP (11.63%). In the federal election, a total of 909 votes were cast, and the voter turnout was 47.3%.

The historical population is given in the following table:

year	population
1527	ca 1,000
1850	1,616
1900	1,876
1950	2,608
1990	3,292
2000	3,227

== Heritage sites of national significance ==
Unterhof Castle, City Archives in the Rathaus (Town council house), Former Dominican Monastery of St. Katharinental with its granary, the zum Goldenen Löwen House and the Goldener Leuen Collection, the Rheinbrücke (Rhine Bridge), and the city walls with Siegelturm are listed as Swiss heritage site of national significance. Both the town of Diessenhofen and St Katharinental Monastery are part of the Inventory of Swiss Heritage Sites.

== Architecture ==
The Altstadt of Diessenhofen centers on the Siegelturm a tower in which seals and official documents are kept. The old covered bridge over the Rhine was rebuilt in 1814. It leads to Gailingen am Hochrhein in Baden-Württemberg in Germany.

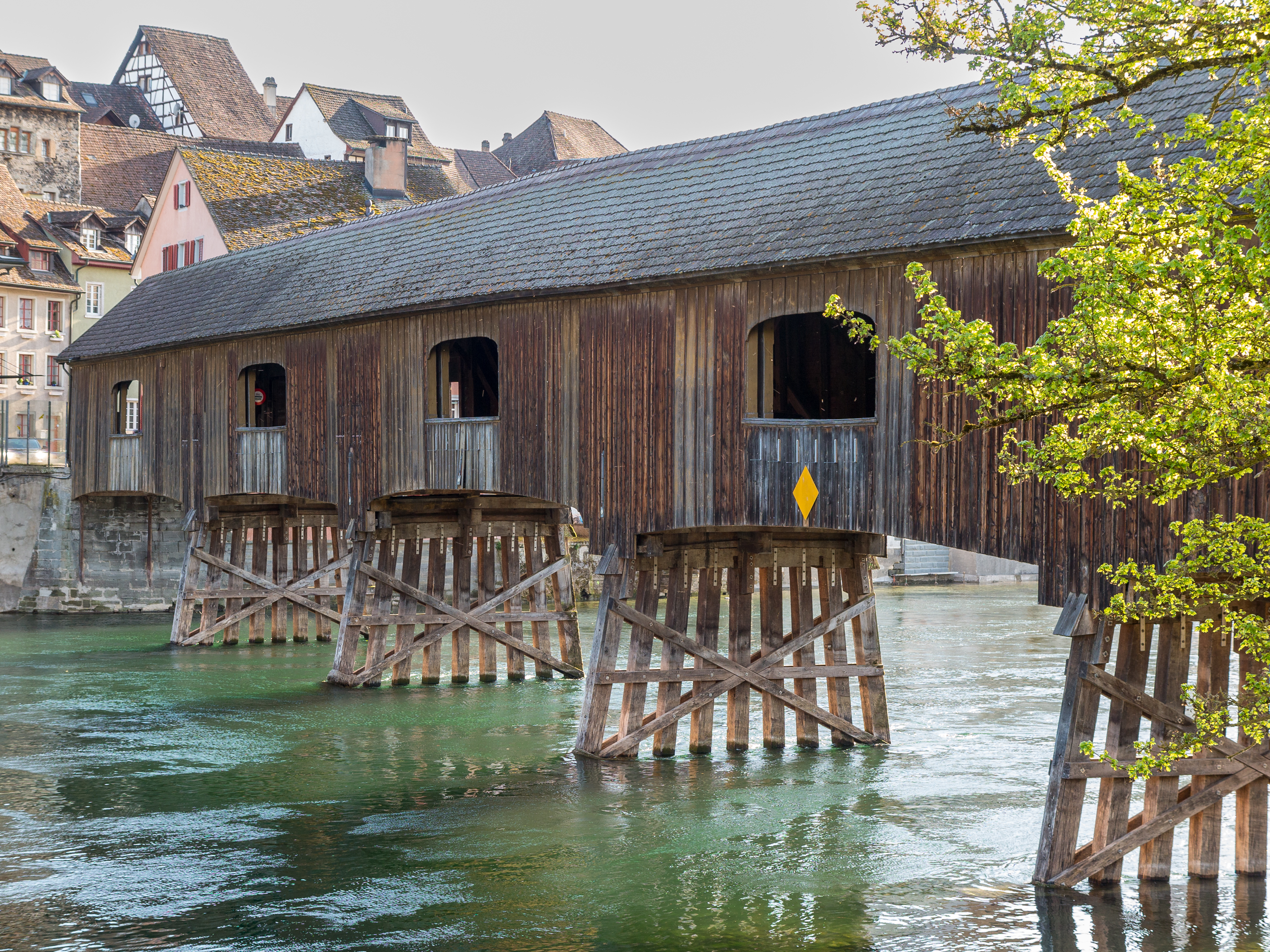
Wooden bridge

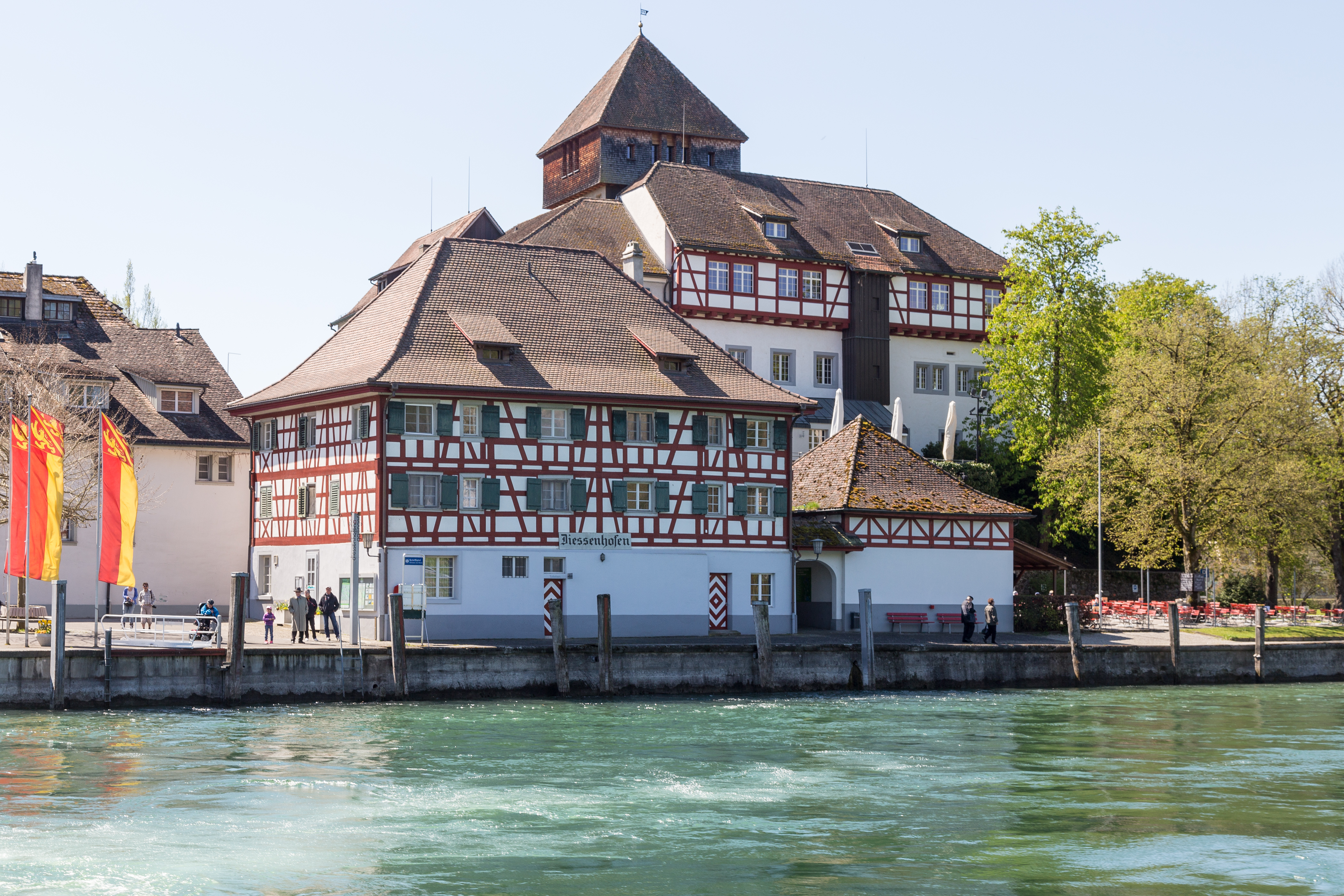
Fischerzunft and Unterhof

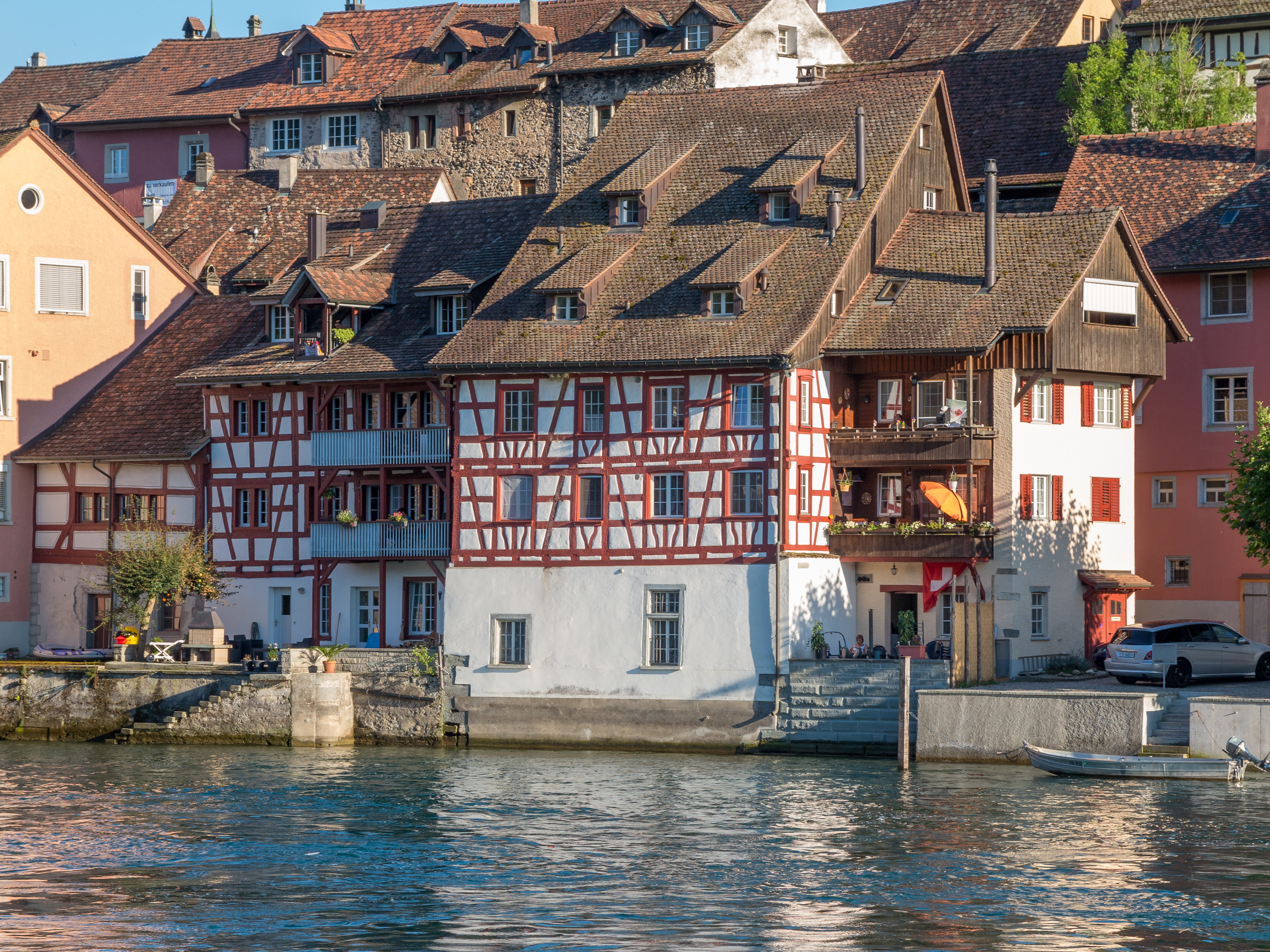
Rheinhalde in Diessenhofen

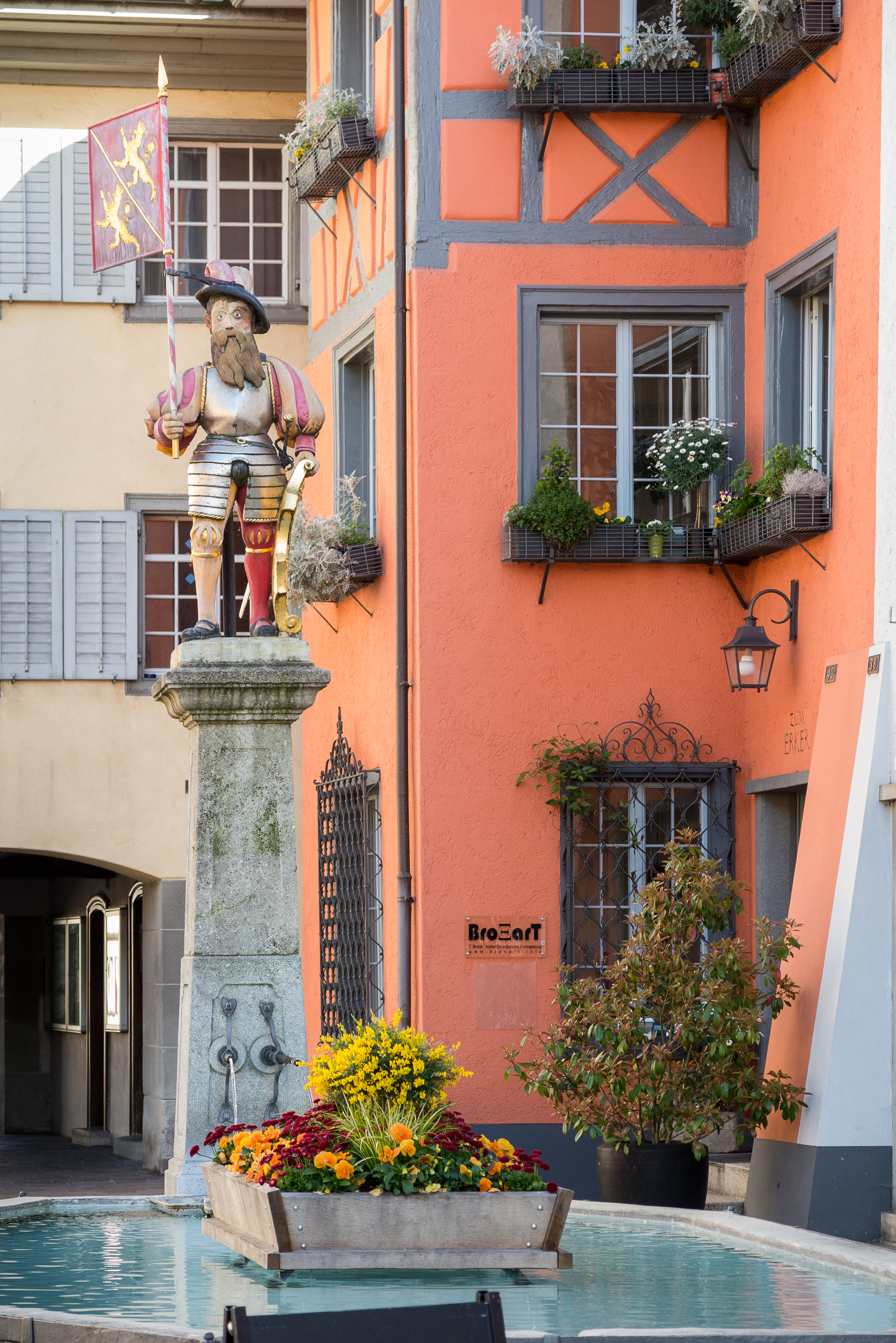
Siegelturm fountain

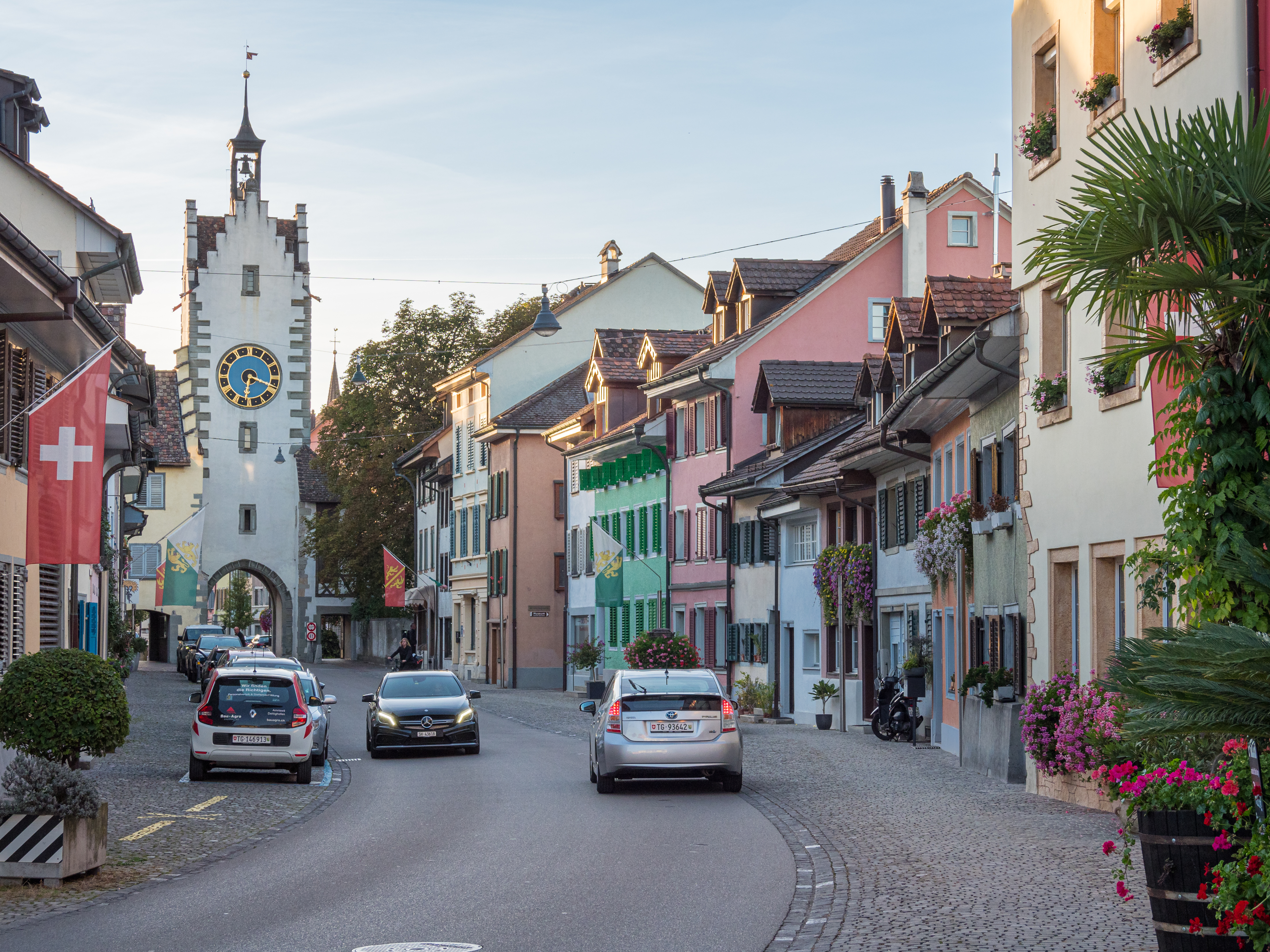
'Obertor' with 'Siegelturm'

== Economy ==
One of the three data centers of SWIFT, the international bank messaging network, is situated in Diessenhofen since 2009.

As of 2007, Diessenhofen had an unemployment rate of 1.59%. As of 2005, there were 74 people employed in the primary economic sector and about 25 businesses involved in this sector. 668 people are employed in the secondary sector and there are 54 businesses in this sector. 901 people are employed in the tertiary sector, with 143 businesses in this sector.

In 2000 there were 2,220 workers who lived in the municipality. Of these, 964 or about 43.4% of the residents worked outside Diessenhofen while 967 people commuted into the municipality for work. There were a total of 2,223 jobs (of at least 6 hours per week) in the municipality. Of the working population, 12.7% used public transportation to get to work, and 44.7% used a private car.

== Religion ==
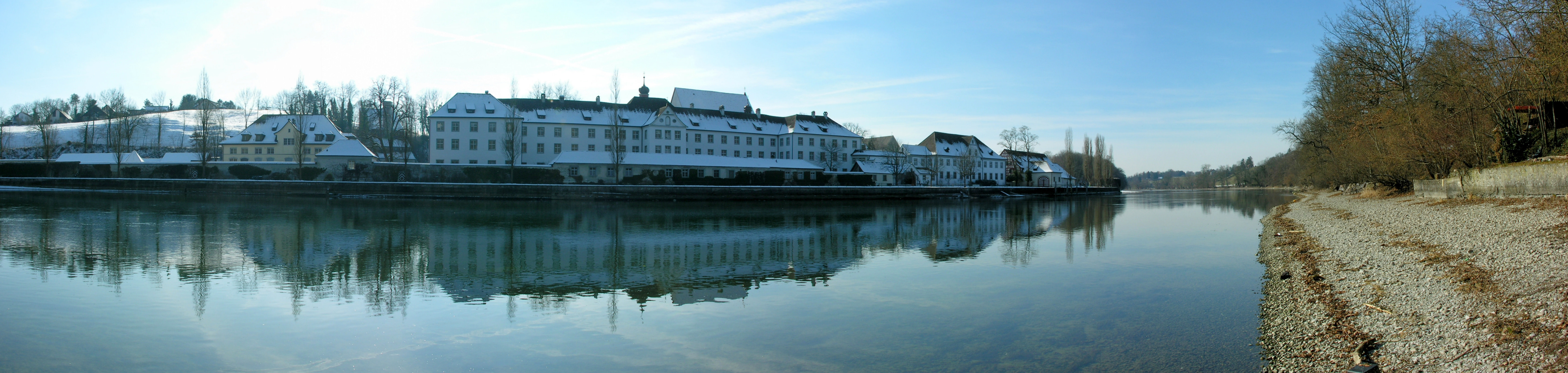
St. Katharinental Monastery

From the 2000 census, 955 or 29.6% were Roman Catholic, while 1,335 or 41.4% belonged to the Swiss Reformed Church. Of the rest of the population, there were 3 Old Catholics (or about 0.09% of the population) who belonged to the Christian Catholic Church of Switzerland there are 98 individuals (or about 3.04% of the population) who belong to the Orthodox Church, and there are 96 individuals (or about 2.97% of the population) who belong to another Christian church. There were 3 individuals (or about 0.09% of the population) who were Jewish, and 318 (or about 9.85% of the population) who are Islamic. There are 11 individuals (or about 0.34% of the population) who belong to another church (not listed on the census), 269 (or about 8.34% of the population) belong to no church, are agnostic or atheist, and 139 individuals (or about 4.31% of the population) did not answer the question.

== Transport ==
Diessenhofen sits on the Lake Line between Schaffhausen and Rorschach and has two railway stations: Diessenhofen, at the southern edge of the city center, and St. Katharinental, near the former Dominican monastery, west of the city center.

The URh offers regular boat services on the High Rhine and Untersee between Schaffhausen and Kreuzlingen, via Konstanz.

== Education ==
The entire Swiss population is generally well educated. In Diessenhofen about 66.5% of the population (between age 25 and 64) have completed either non-mandatory upper secondary education or additional higher education (either university or a Fachhochschule).

Diessenhofen is home to the Diessenhofen primary and secondary school district. In the 2008/2009 school year there are 691 students at either the primary or secondary levels. There are 131 children in the kindergarten, and the average class size is 18.71 kindergartners. Of the children in kindergarten, 63 or 48.1% are female, 32 or 24.4% are not Swiss citizens and 30 or 22.9% do not speak German natively. The lower and upper primary levels begin at about age 5–6 and lasts for 6 years. There are 200 children in who are at the lower primary level and 236 children in the upper primary level. The average class size in the primary school is 20.1 students. At the lower primary level, there are 93 children or 46.5% of the total population who are female, 52 or 26.0% are not Swiss citizens and 48 or 24.0% do not speak German natively. In the upper primary level, there are 100 or 42.4% who are female, 59 or 25.0% are not Swiss citizens and 63 or 26.7% do not speak German natively. At the secondary level, students are divided according to performance.

The secondary level begins at about age 12 and usually lasts 3 years. There are 220 teenagers who are in the advanced school, of which 125 or 56.8% are female, 45 or 20.5% are not Swiss citizens and 41 or 18.6% do not speak German natively. There are 19 teenagers who are in the standard school, of which 8 or 42.1% are female, 5 or 26.3% are not Swiss citizens and 5 or 26.3% do not speak German natively. Finally, there are 16 teenagers who are in special or remedial classes, of which 6 or 37.5% are female, 8 or 50.0% are not Swiss citizens and 8 or 50.0% do not speak German natively. The average class size for all classes at the secondary level is 19.92 students.

== Notable people ==
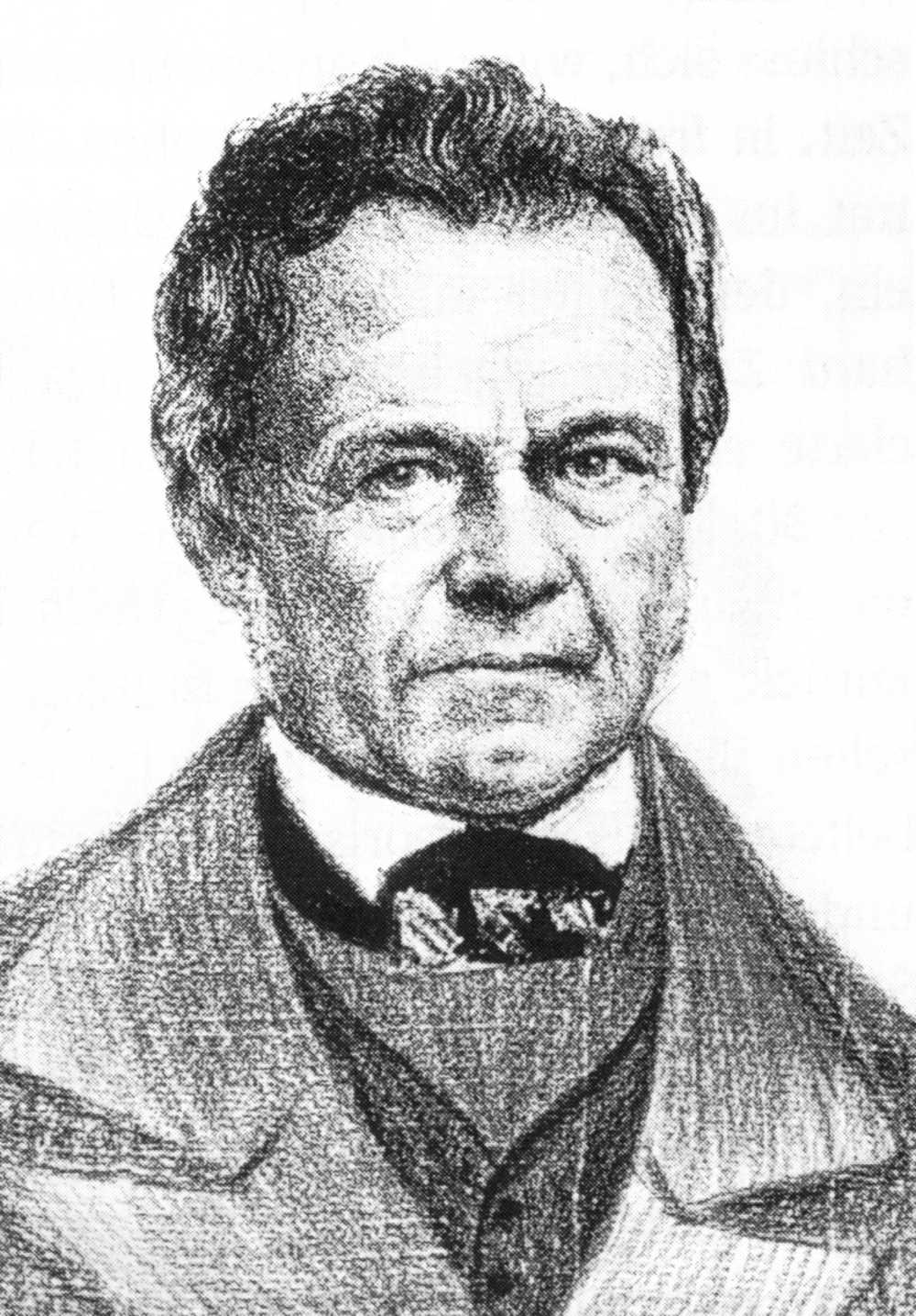
Johann Georg Rauch

- Gabriel Bucelin (1599 in Diessenhofen – 1681), Benedictine polymath, humanist, writer and cartographer
- Johann Conrad Brunner (1653 in Diessenhofen – 1727), a Swiss anatomist, cited for his work on the pancreas and duodenum
- Johann Georg Rauch (1789 in Diessenhofen – 1851), a Swiss businessman and politician
- Georg Fein (1803 – 1869 in Diessenhofen), a German democratic journalist, an early German socialist and a liberal nationalist, lived in Diessenhofen from 1862
- Conrad Brunner (1859 in Diessenhofen – 1927), a Swiss physician, surgeon and medical historian, particularly concerned with the disinfection of wounds and their healing
- Richard Dobson (1942 – 2017 in Diessenhofen), an American singer-songwriter and author, he moved to Switzerland in 1999
