= Unterhof Castle =

Castle in Diessenhofen, Switzerland

Coordinates: 47°41′24″N 8°44′52″E

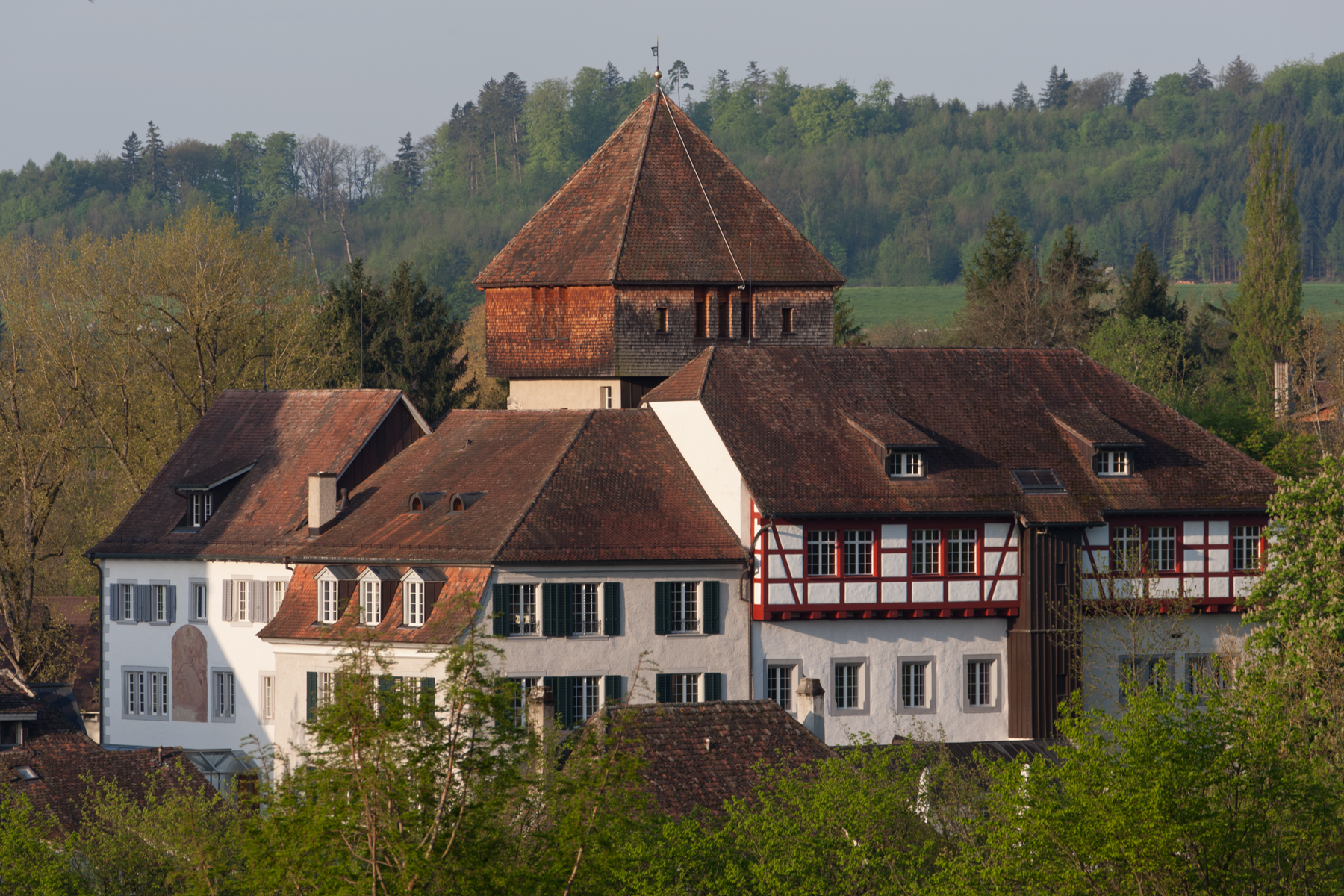
Unterhof Castle

Unterhof Castle is a castle in the municipality of Diessenhofen of the Canton of Thurgau in Switzerland. It is a Swiss heritage site of national significance.

== See also ==
- List of castles in Switzerland
