= Brunner's glands =

Duodenal submucosal cells secreting bicarbonate-rich mucus

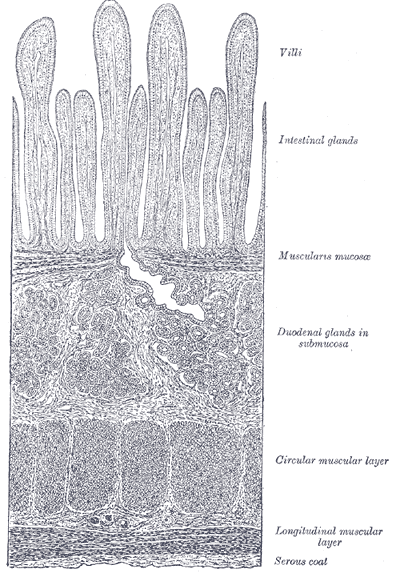
- Section of duodenum. (Duodenal glands in submucosa are labeled at right, fourth from the top.)

Details
- System: Digestive system
- Location: Duodenum

Identifiers
- Latin: glandulae duodenales
- MeSH: D002011
- TA98: A05.6.02.017
- TA2: 2957
- FMA: 71622

Brunner's glands (or duodenal glands) are compound tubuloalveolar submucosal glands found in that portion of the duodenum proximal to the hepatopancreatic sphincter (i.e sphincter of Oddi).

One of the main functions of the glands is to secrete alkaline (bicarbonate-containing) mucus in order to:

- protect the duodenum from the acidic content of chyme (which enters the duodenum from the stomach),
- provide an alkaline environment which promotes the activity of intestinal enzymes,
- lubricate the intestinal walls.

They are the distinguishing feature of the duodenum, and are named for the Swiss physician who first described them, Johann Conrad Brunner.

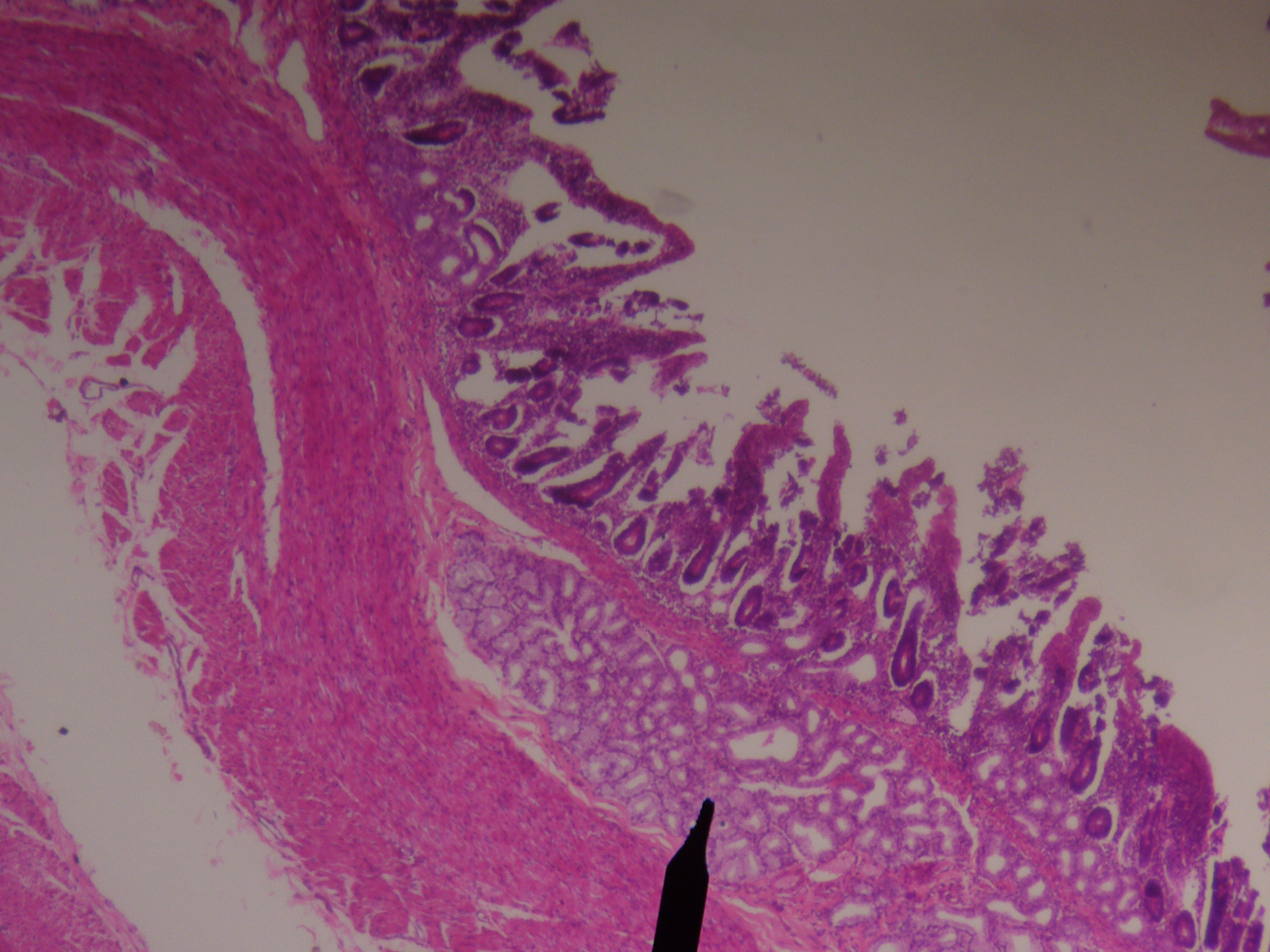
Human Brunner's gland

== Structure ==
Duodenal glands are situated within the mucosa and submucosa of the duodenum. They are most abundant near the pylorus, growing shorter and more sparse distally towards the terminal portion of the duodenum.

The duodenum can be distinguished from the jejunum and ileum by the presence of Brunner's glands in the submucosa.

== Histology ==
Their excretory cannals are tortuous, opening at the bases of the villi.

Two forms of duodenal glands are distinguished: the external group (which are more voluminous and extend into the duodenal submucosa), and the internal group (which are smaller and are situated within the duodenal mucosa).

== Function ==
They also secrete epidermal growth factor, which inhibits parietal and chief cells of the stomach from secreting acid and their digestive enzymes. This is another form of protection for the duodenum.

The Brunner glands, which empty into the intestinal glands, secrete an alkaline fluid composed of mucin, which exerts a physiologic anti-acid function by coating the duodenal epithelium, therefore protecting it from the acid chyme of the stomach. Furthermore, in response to the presence of acid in the duodenum, these glands secrete pepsinogen and urogastrone, which inhibit gastric acid secretion.

== Clinical significance ==
Hyperplasia of Brunner glands with a lesion greater than 1 cm was initially described as a Brunner gland adenoma. Several features of these lesions favor their designation as hamartomas, including the lack of encapsulation; the mixture of acini, smooth muscles, adipose tissue, Paneth cells, and mucosal glands; and the lack of any cell atypia. These hamartomas are rare, with approximately 150 cases described in the literature. It is estimated that they represent approximately 5–10% of benign duodenal tumors. They are variable in size, typically 1–3 cm, with only a few reported cases of lesions larger than 5 cm.

Most patients with Brunner gland hamartomas are asymptomatic or have nonspecific complaints such as nausea, bloating, or vague abdominal pain.

Most reports in the literature describe local surgical resection of Brunner gland hamartoma via duodenotomy. Increasingly, successful endoscopic resection has been reported and is primarily used for pedunculated Brunner gland hamartomas. The endoscopic approach in selective cases appears to be safe, less invasive, and less costly.

== See also ==
- Peutz–Jeghers syndrome
- List of distinct cell types in the adult human body
