= Gisou van der Goot =

Swiss-Dutch molecular biologist

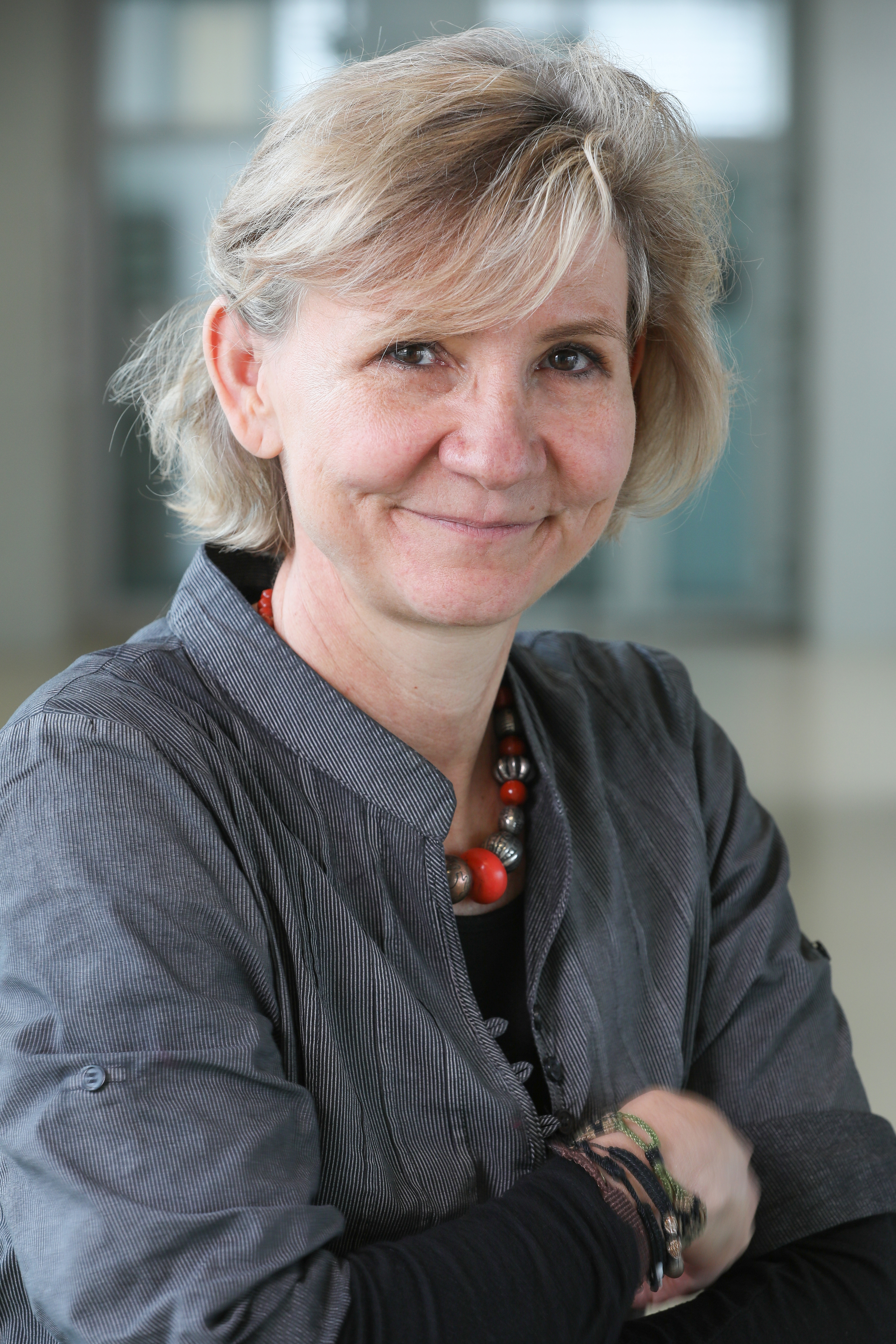
- Gisou van der Goot in 2018
- Born: Françoise Gisou van der Goot; 19 September 1964 (age 61); Tehran, Iran
- Education: École Centrale de Paris
- Spouse: Jean Gruenberg
- Awards: Marcel Benoist Prize (2009); Suffrage Science award (2020)
- Scientific career
- Fields: Biology
- Workplaces: École Polytechnique Fédérale de Lausanne (EPFL)
- Thesis: Role Respectif des Membranes Apicales et Basolaterales dans les Mecanismes de Transfport d'eau a Travers les Structures Epitheliales (1990)
- Website: www.epfl.ch/labs/vdg/

Françoise Gisou van der Goot (born 19 September 1964 in Tehran) is a Swiss-Dutch cell biologist. She is a professor and the Vice President for Responsible Transformation at EPFL (École Polytechnique Fédérale de Lausanne).

== Career ==
Gisou van der Goot studied engineering at the École Centrale de Paris. She pursued a PhD in molecular biophysics at the Saclay Nuclear Research Centre (Pierre and Marie Curie University). After her PhD, she was a postdoctoral researcher at the European Molecular Biology Laboratory (EMBL) in Heidelberg. In 1994 she worked as a group leader in the Department of Biochemistry of the University of Geneva and, subsequently, from 2001 as associate professor in the department of microbiology and molecular medicine. Since 2006, she has been full professor of molecular and cellular microbiology at the School of Life Sciences of EPFL, where she was also dean until 2020. In September 2020, she was appointed Vice President for Responsible Transformation at EPFL for a term starting in 2021.

== Research ==
Gisou van der Goot leads the Laboratory of Cell and Membrane Biology at the School of Life Sciences of the École Polytechnique Fédérale de Lausanne (EPFL). Her laboratory studies various aspects of cellular and intracellular membrane dynamics. Notably, it aims to better understand the way protein palmitoylation regulates endoplasmic reticulum function and protein trafficking, the mechanisms which allow bacterial proteins such as the anthrax toxin to penetrate target cells, and the molecular mechanisms leading to juvenile hyaline fibromatosis, a rare and debilitating genetic disorder. In the context of the COVID-19 pandemic, Gisou van der Goot declared to have dedicated part of her laboratory to study SARS-CoV-2.

=== Awards and honors ===
Gisou van der Goot obtained a European Molecular Biology Organization (EMBO) Young Investigator award in 2001 and an Howard Hughes International Scholar award in 2005. In 2009, she received the Leenaards Foundation Research Prize and the Marcel Benoist Prize. The latter two prizes were awarded for her contributions to the biochemistry of the bacterial toxin of the anthrax pathogen at the host cell membrane. In 2020, she was awarded the Suffrage Science award.

She has been member of scientific boards such as the Swiss National Science Foundation, the Swiss Science Council and the European Research Council (ERC).

== Selected works ==
- Klionsky, Daniel J.; Abdelmohsen, Kotb; Abe, Akihisa; Abedin, Md Joynal; Abeliovich, Hagai; Acevedo Arozena, Abraham; Adachi, Hiroaki; Adams, Christopher M.; Adams, Peter D.; Adeli, Khosrow; Adhihetty, Peter J.; Adler, Sharon G.; Agam, Galila; Agarwal, Rajesh; Aghi, Manish K.; Agnello, Maria; Agostinis, Patrizia; Aguilar, Patricia V.; Aguirre-Ghiso, Julio; Airoldi, Edoardo M.; Ait-Si-Ali, Slimane; Akematsu, Takahiko; Akporiaye, Emmanuel T.; Al-Rubeai, Mohamed; Albaiceta, Guillermo M.; Albanese, Chris; Albani, Diego; Albert, Matthew L.; Aldudo, Jesus; et al. (2016). "Guidelines for the use and interpretation of assays for monitoring autophagy (3rd edition)". Autophagy. 12 (1): 1–222. doi:10.1080/15548627.2015.1100356. PMC 4835977. PMID 26799652.
- Abrami, Laurence; Liu, Shihui; Cosson, Pierre; Leppla, Stephen H.; Van Der Goot, F. Gisou (2003). "Anthrax toxin triggers endocytosis of its receptor via a lipid raft–mediated clathrin-dependent process". Journal of Cell Biology. 160 (3): 321–328. doi:10.1083/jcb.200211018. PMC 2172673. PMID 12551953.
- Gurcel, Laure; Abrami, Laurence; Girardin, Stephen; Tschopp, Jurg; Van Der Goot, F. Gisou (2006). "Caspase-1 Activation of Lipid Metabolic Pathways in Response to Bacterial Pore-Forming Toxins Promotes Cell Survival". Cell. 126 (6): 1135–1145. doi:10.1016/j.cell.2006.07.033. PMID 16990137. S2CID 616037.
- Pizarro-Cerdá, Javier; MéResse, StéPhane; Parton, Robert G.; Van Der Goot, Gisou; Sola-Landa, Alberto; Lopez-Goñi, Ignacio; Moreno, Edgardo; Gorvel, Jean-Pierre (1998). "Brucella abortus Transits through the Autophagic Pathway and Replicates in the Endoplasmic Reticulum of Nonprofessional Phagocytes". Infection and Immunity. 66 (12): 5711–5724. doi:10.1128/IAI.66.12.5711-5724.1998. PMC 108722. PMID 9826346.
- Van Der Goot, F. G.; González-Mañas, J. M.; Lakey, J. H.; Pattus, F. (1991). "A 'molten-globule' membrane-insertion intermediate of the pore-forming domain of colicin A". Nature. 354 (6352): 408–410. Bibcode:1991Natur.354..408V. doi:10.1038/354408a0. PMID 1956406. S2CID 4301346.
- Gruenberg, Jean; Van Der Goot, F. Gisou (2006). "Mechanisms of pathogen entry through the endosomal compartments". Nature Reviews Molecular Cell Biology. 7 (7): 495–504. doi:10.1038/nrm1959. PMID 16773132. S2CID 429568.
- Peraro, Matteo Dal; Van Der Goot, F. Gisou (2016). "Pore-forming toxins: Ancient, but never really out of fashion". Nature Reviews Microbiology. 14 (2): 77–92. doi:10.1038/nrmicro.2015.3. PMID 26639780. S2CID 6784199.
- Dupont, Nicolas; Lacas-Gervais, Sandra; Bertout, Julie; Paz, Irit; Freche, Barbara; Van Nhieu, Guy Tran; Van Der Goot, F. Gisou; Sansonetti, Philippe J.; Lafont, Frank (2009). "Shigella Phagocytic Vacuolar Membrane Remnants Participate in the Cellular Response to Pathogen Invasion and Are Regulated by Autophagy". Cell Host & Microbe. 6 (2): 137–149. doi:10.1016/j.chom.2009.07.005. PMID 19683680.

== Personal life ==
Gisou van der Goot is married to Swiss biologist Jean Gruenberg and has two children.
