= Conrad Brunner (physician) =

Swiss physician, surgeon and medical historian

Conrad Brunner (31 August 1859 in Diessenhofen – 8 June 1927 in Zurich) was a Swiss physician, surgeon and medical historian. He was particularly concerned with the disinfection of wounds and their healing.

Brunner came from a family of Swiss physicians and pharmacists, among whom was Johann Conrad Brunner. His father, John Brunner, was a physician and botanist. Brunner received medical degrees from the University of Zurich and the University of Leipzig, and went on to receive an advanced academic degree of Doctor of Medicine in 1885. He then completed his practical surgeon training studying under Rudolf Ulrich Krönlein. Beginning in 1888, he took a series of trips to noted surgeries, studying under Theodor Billroth at the University of Vienna, Ernst von Bergmann at the Friedrich Wilhelm University of Berlin, and other surgeons at Leipzig University, the Royal Saxon Polytechnic in Dresden and the Ludwig-Maximilians-Universität München. In 1888, with the third volume in 1889, he published his Erfahrungen und Studien über Wundinfektion und Wundbehandlung.

== Life ==
In 1889, Brunner married Clara Margot and opened a private practice in Zurich, with privileges at a number of nearby hospitals. Beginning in 1890, he served as an associate professor of surgery at the University of Zurich, relinquishing the position in 1897. From 1896 to 1922, he served as the chief physician at the Cantonal Hospital in Münsterlingen. In 1922, he was the co-founder of the Thurgauisch-Schaffhausischen Pulmonary Sanatorium in Davos, primarily for tuberculosis sufferers.

== Work ==
Conrad Brunner conducted and published clinical, bacteriological and experimental studies on the effectiveness of various contemporary wound disinfection methods. He was able to prove that his method, namely the Brunner's Jodalkoholdesinfektion, offered by far the best guarantee against the occurrence of wound diseases.

Brunner researched and published on topics in the history of medicine, mostly as related to Switzerland.

=== Selected publications ===
- Erfahrungen und Studien über Wundinfektion und Wundbehandlung. Frauenfeld, Switzerland: J. Huber. 1898. OCLC 14781957. in three volumes.
- Die Verwundeten in den Kriegen der alten Eidgenossenschaft: Geschichte des Heeressanitätswesens und der Kriegschirurgie in schweizerischen Landen bis zum Jahre 1798. Tübingen, Germany: H. Laupp'schen Buchhandlung. 1903. OCLC 165157358.
- Handbuch der Wundbehandlung. Stuttgart, Germany: Ferdinand Enke. 1916. OCLC 463027241.
- Über Medizin und Krankenpflege im Mittelalter in schweizerischen Landen. Zurich: Seldwyla. 1922. OCLC 9548062.

== Honours ==
- 1921 Conrad Brunner received the Marcel Benoist Prize in recognition of his achievements in the field of wound care and wound disinfection.
- 1922 Conrad Brunner received an honorary philosophy doctorate from the University of Zurich for his research on the history of medicine.
