= Transdetermination =

Transdetermination is a concept in developmental biology to describe the process by which pluripotent stem cells change their fate from becoming one kind of specialized cell lineage to a different lineage. It is contrasted to transdifferentiation where a differentiated cell switches to another lineage without intermediate stages of dedifferentiation. In Drosophila, it has been shown that imaginal disc cells could convert from eye to wing tissue through a factor called winged eye (wge) which induces histone modifications that lead to the altered fate.
