= Johann Conrad Brunner =

Swiss anatomist

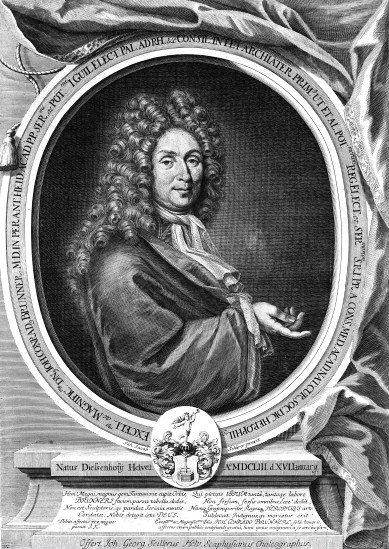
- Portrait of Johann Conrad Brunner
- Born: 16 January 1653; Diessenhofen
- Died: 2 October 1727 (aged 74); Mannheim
- Education: Schaffhausen, Strasbourg and Paris
- Medical career
- Profession: anatomist

Johann Conrad Brunner (16 January 1653 – 2 October 1727) was a Swiss anatomist, especially cited for his work on the pancreas and duodenum.

== Life ==
Brunner was born in Diessenhofen, and studied medicine in Schaffhausen, Strasbourg, Amsterdam, London and Paris. At Schaffhausen he studied under Johann Jakob Wepfer (1620–1695), who was also his father-in-law. He received his doctorate in 1672 from the University of Strasbourg. Beginning in 1686 he was a professor of anatomy and physiology at the University of Heidelberg. In 1716, Brunner was appointed personal physician to Charles III Philip the new Elector of the Palatinate. He received many accolades during his life including a knighthood with the title "Brunn von Hammerstein". He died in 1727 in Mannheim, Germany.

== Work ==
Brunner is remembered for his experiments and studies of the pancreas and the internal secretions associated with that organ. In 1683 he removed the pancreas from a dog and noticed that the animal experienced extreme thirst and polyuria. Despite his intuitive grasp of the connection between the pancreas and diabetes, he was unable to provide a theoretical link for the role of the pancreas in that disease. He published his findings on pancreatic research in a treatise titled Experimenta Nova circa Pancreas. Accedit diatribe de lympha & genuino pancreatis usu.

in 1687 he described tubuloalveolar glands in the submucous layer of the duodenum, which were later named Brunner's glands. Two disorders associated with these glands are:

- "Brunner's gland hyperplasia": Hypertrophy of Brunner's glands in the submucosal layer of the duodenum.
- "Brunner's gland adenoma": Polyp-like tumours arising from Brunner's glands.

=== Written works ===
- Poetum monstrosum et bicipitem, Diss. med. Strassburg 1672
- De glandulis in duodeno intestino detectis, Heidelberg 1687
- Experimenta nova circa pancreas; accedit diatriba de lympha et genuina pancreatis usu, Amsterdam 1682, nov ed.: Leyden 1722
