= Life Sciences Switzerland =

Swiss scientific society federation

- Abbreviation: LS2
- Formation: 1969
- Type: Scientific society
- President: Jean Gruenberg
- Affiliations: Swiss Academy of Natural Sciences
- Website: www.ls2.ch
- Formerly called: Union of the Swiss Societies for Experimental Biology (USGEB)

Life Sciences Switzerland (LS2) is the Swiss federation of scientific societies for life sciences. It was formerly known as the Union of the Swiss Societies for Experimental Biology (USGEB). It was founded in 1969, with the founding meeting taking place in Bern, Switzerland. At the founding, four societies, Swiss Society for Physiology, Swiss Society for Biochemistry, Swiss Society for Pharmacology and Swiss Society for Cell & Molecular Biology comprised the original societies.

Life Sciences Switzerland is a member of the Swiss Academy of Natural Sciences (SCNAT).

== LS2 sections ==
Its members are:

- LS2 Section Molecular and Cellular Biology (Swiss Society of Molecular and Cellular Biosciences (SSMCB) fused with Life Sciences Switzerland in June 2015)
- LS2 Physiology section (Swiss Society of Physiology (SSP) – fused with Life Sciences Switzerland in June 2015)
- LS2 Section Proteomics (Swiss Society of Proteomics (SPS) – fused with Life Sciences Switzerland in June 2015)

== LS2 partner societies ==
- Swiss Society of Anatomy, Histology and Embryology (SSAHE)
- Swiss Society of Experimental Pharmacology (SSEP)
- Swiss Chemical Society (SCS)
- Swiss Laboratory Animal Science Association (SGV)

=== LS2 affiliated societies ===
- Swiss Society of Microbiology (SGM)
- Swiss Society for Neuroscience (SSN)
- Swiss Laboratory Animal Science Association (SGV-SSEAL)
- Swiss Plant Science Web (SPSW)
- Swiss Society of Pathology (SSPath)
- Swiss Society of Plant Physiology (SGPf)
- Società Ticinese delle Scienze Biomediche e Chimiche (STSBC)
- Federation of European Physiological Societies (FEPS)
- Federation of European Biochemical Societies (FEBS)
- European Proteomics Association (EuPA)
- European Biophysical Societies' Association (EBSA)
- The American Society for Cell Biology (ASCB)
- International Union of Biochemistry and Molecular Biology (IUBMB)
- International Union of Physiological Sciences (IUPS)
- International Union of Pure and Applied Biophysics (IUPAB)

== Annual meetings ==
- 2003: Davos
- 2004: Fribourg
- 2005: ETH Zürich, Zürich
- 2006: Geneva
- 2007: Basel
- 2008: Lausanne
- 2009: Interlaken
- 2010: Lugano
- 2011: Zürich
- 2012: Lausanne
- 2013: Zürich
- 2014: University of Lausanne, Lausanne
- 2015: Zürich
- 2016: University of Lausanne, Lausanne
- 2017: University of Zurich, Zürich, 2–3 February
- 2018: University of Lausanne, Lausanne, 12–13 February
- 2023: Campus Irchel, Universität Zürich, Zurich, 16 – 17 February 2023

== See also ==
- Swiss Academies of Arts and Sciences
- Science and technology in Switzerland
- Pharmaceutical industry in Switzerland
- Federation of European Biochemical Societies
- International Union of Biochemistry and Molecular Biology
