= List of presidents of École Polytechnique Fédérale de Lausanne =

EPFL (Swiss Federal Institute of Technology in Lausanne; French: Ecole polytechnique fédérale de Lausanne) has had five presidents since the school was created in 1969.

In 1968, Maurice Cosandey, the president of the École polytechnique universitaire de Lausanne (Lausanne University Polytechnic School, or EPUL) came up with the idea of turning that school into a federal institute. This resulted in the creation of EPFL in 1969, with Cosandey as its first president. He has been succeeded in this role by four other people, in the following order: Bernard Vittoz, Jean-Claude Badoux, Patrick Aebischer, and Martin Vetterli (the current president, since 1 January 2017).

== Appointment process ==
The EPFL president is appointed by the Swiss Federal Council for renewable four-year terms. The process for appointing the presidents of the Swiss federal institutes of technology is not subject to strict rules. Martin Vetterli, the current president, was nominated by the Federal Department of Economic Affairs, Education and Research, which acted on the recommendation of the Board of the Swiss Federal Institutes of Technology (ETH Board).

== EPFL presidents ==
Name		Term of office		Notes
6	Anna Fontcuberta i Morral (1975)	1 January 2025		Anna Fontcuberta i Morral, a Spanish and Swiss physicist and materials scientist and professor at the Institute of Materials Science & Engineering since 2008 (full professor since 2019), will succeed Martin Vetterli from 1 January 2025. She will be the first woman to hold this position. Since 2021, she serves as the associate vice-president for Centers and Platforms at EPFL, and she also served as the president of the EPFL WISH foundation between 2018 and 2020.
5	Martin Vetterli (4 October 1957)	1 January 2017	31 December 2024	Martin Vetterli, an engineer specializing in digital signal processing and a full professor of communication systems at EPFL since 1995, took over from Patrick Aebischer on 1 January 2017. Vetterli served as vice president of EPFL from 2004 to 2011, dean of the School of Computer and Communications Sciences from 2011 to 2012, and president of the National Research Council of the Swiss National Science Foundation from 2013 to 2016.
4	Patrick Aebischer (22 November 1954)	17 March 2000	31 December 2016	Patrick Aebischer, a trained medical doctor, further developed life sciences at EPFL by creating a separate school in this field. Aebischer also drove the campus’ growth, with the Rolex Learning Center, the SwissTech Convention Center and the ArtLab all built during his tenure.
3	Jean-Claude Badoux (19 February 1935)	1 December 1992	29 February 2000	Jean-Claude Badoux graduated from the Swiss Federal Institute of Technology in Zurich in 1958 with a degree in civil engineering and became a professor at EPUL in 1967. He taught in the rural engineering and civil engineering departments until 1992, when he was appointed president of EPFL. Badoux was one of the architects of the “Triangular Project,” which, in 2001, redistributed the fields taught at EPFL, the University of Lausanne and the University of Geneva.
2	Bernard Vittoz (21 November 1927 - 9 August 2006)	1 August 1978	30 November 1992	Bernard Vittoz served as a full professor of general mechanics, atomic engineering and solid-state physics at EPUL and then EPFL. During his tenure as EPFL president, he forged close ties between EPFL and the business world and was one of the co-founders of EPFL's science park.
1	Maurice Cosandey (8 February 1918 - 4 December 2018)	1 April 1963 (EPUL); 1 January 1969 (EPFL)	31 July 1978	Maurice Cosandey, who earned a degree in civil engineering from EPUL, was the driving force behind that school’s transformation into EPFL and its relocation to the Ecublens campus, which is still its home today.

== Bibliography ==
- Histoire de l'École polytechnique de Lausanne : 1953-1978, Presses polytechniques et universitaires romandes, 1999. ISBN 9782880743956
- Michel Pont, Chronique de l'EPFL 1978-2000, Presses polytechniques et universitaires romandes, 2010. ISBN 9782880748760
- "Présidents dès 1853". information.epfl.ch (in French).
