= Stefan Catsicas =

Swiss scientist and entrepreneur

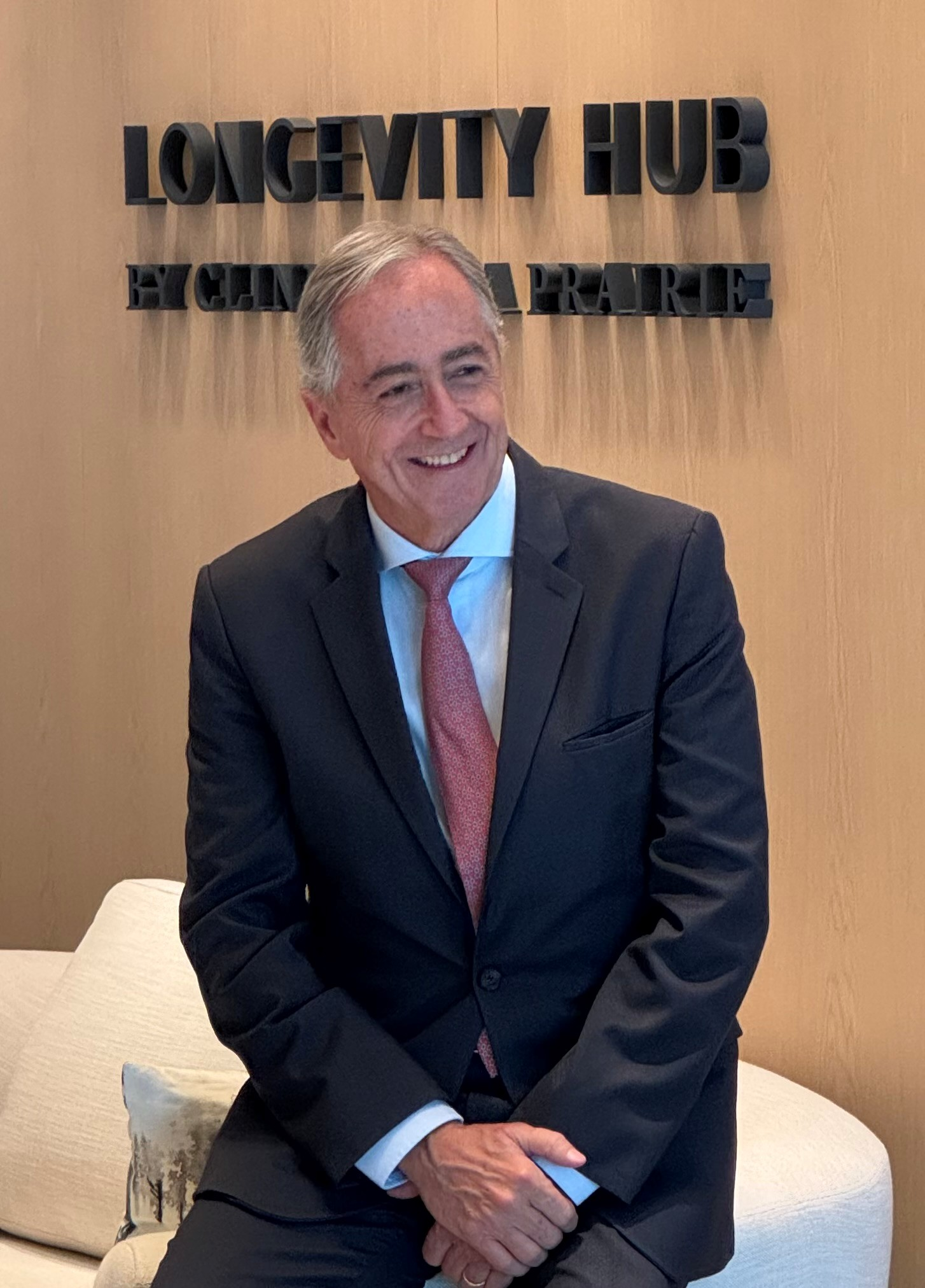
- Born: November 23, 1958 (age 67)
- Education: University of Lausanne, École Polytechnique Fédérale of Lausanne, King Abdullah University of Science & Technology of Djeddah
- Scientific career
- Fields: Biology, Neurosciences, Pharmaceutical

Stefan Catsicas, born in 1958, is a Swiss molecular biologist specialised in neurosciences of Italian and Greek origins. He was executive director of Nestlé from 2013 to 2018, vice-president of research of the Ecole Polytechnique Fédérale in Lausanne (EPFL) from 2000 to 2004 and director of the institute of cell biology at the School of Medicine in Lausanne from 1996 à 2000. He is currently the managing partner of Skyviews Life Science, a Swiss advisory company in life sciences; and the director of Precision Health Corp., a private investment company based in the Isle of Man.

== Early life and education ==
Stefan Catsicas started his scientific training with studies in natural sciences at the University of Lausanne, and a doctoral thesis on the development of the nervous system.., which he obtained in 1987. He then continued his studies in this field at the Research Institute of Scripps Clinic in San Diego, California.

== Career ==
Back in Switzerland, he became Head of the Neurobiology Department of Glaxo in Geneva from 1991 to 1996, before pursuing his academic career at the University of Lausanne as professor and chair of Cell Biology, and then as professor of Cellular Engineering at the EPFL.

In 2000, Patrick Aebischer appointed him Vice President of Research at the EPFL. To promote pluridisciplinarity on campus, he led the collaborations with Alinghi for the America's Cup, and with Solar Impulse for the world tour with a solar-energy powered plane.

In 2004, he left his position at the EPFL and co-founded Tilocor Life Science, a biotechnology group of private companies.

In 2011, Catsicas became Provost and Executive Vice-president of the King Abdullah University of Science & Technology.

In 2013, he was appointed to the executive board of Nestlé Global, as Chief Technology Officer (CTO), a position he held from 2013 to 2018

In 2018, he published his first novel in French, La Séquence (Editions Favre) which sets in the field of genetic research.

Since 2018, Stefan Catsicas is the managing director of Skyviews Life Science, a Swiss advisory company in life sciences, including biotechnology, advanced nutrition and digital health. He is also the co-founder and director of the private investment company Precision Health Corp., based in the Isle of Man.
