= Vetterli =

Vetterli may refer to:

- Vetterli rifle, series of Swiss Army service rifles
- M1870 Italian Vetterli, Italian service rifle
- Martin Vetterli (born 1957), Swiss electrical engineering academic
