= Vivek Goyal =

American engineering professor, author

Vivek K Goyal
- Born: Waterloo, Iowa, U.S.
- Education: University of Iowa; University of California, Berkeley
- Scientific career
- Fields: Signal processing Computational imaging Information theory
- Workplaces: Boston University; Massachusetts Institute of Technology; Bell Labs
- Doctoral advisor: Martin Vetterli

Vivek K Goyal is an American engineering professor, author, and inventor. He is currently Professor of Electrical and Computer Engineering at Boston University (BU). He was named Fellow of the Institute of Electrical and Electronics Engineers (IEEE) in 2014 and named OSA (now Optica) Fellow in the 2020 class. He was also named Fellow of the American Association for the Advancement of Science in the 2022 class. He is a recipient of a 2024 Guggenheim Fellowship.

== Education and career ==
Goyal attended Malcolm Price Laboratory School in Cedar Falls, Iowa, through graduation from its Northern University High School division. He received BS and BSE degrees from the University of Iowa in 1993 and MS and PhD degrees from University of California, Berkeley, in 1995 and 1998, respectively. From 1998 to 2000 he served as a Member of Technical Staff at Bell Labs, and from 2001 to 2003 served as a Senior Research Engineer at Digital Fountain. He returned to UC Berkeley in 2003 as a visiting scholar, and from 2004 to 2013 was with the Massachusetts Institute of Technology, including holding the Esther and Harold E. Edgerton chair in the Department of Electrical Engineering and Computer Science. He has been with Boston University since 2016, after two years with the Nest Labs division of Alphabet Inc.

=== Scientific contributions ===
Goyal coauthored the 2014 textbook Foundations of Signal Processing with Martin Vetterli and Jelena Kovačević, which was reviewed in IEEE Signal Processing Magazine.

In 2013, Goyal's group invented first-photon imaging, a method to generate 3D depth and reflectivity images from exactly one detected photon per pixel, even when up to half of the detected photons are due to ambient light. Publication of an article introducing the method in Science resulted in widespread news coverage.

In an article published in Nature in 2019, Goyal's group introduced a method for non-line-of-sight (NLOS) imaging that uses only an ordinary digital camera. This contrasts with many earlier methods that use pulsed laser illumination and detectors sensitive to single photons. He later collaborated on work that extended laser-based NLOS imaging to 1.43 km stand-off distance.

U.S. patents have been issued for 21 of Goyal's inventions.

== Awards and honors ==
- 1998 Eliahu I. Jury Award of the University of California, Berkeley for outstanding achievement in the area of systems, communications, control, or signal processing
- 2002 IEEE Signal Processing Society Magazine Award for Multiple Description Coding: Compression Meets the Network
- 2013 MIT $100K Entrepreneurship Competition Launch Contest Grand Prize for 3dim
- 2014 IEEE International Conference on Image Processing Best Paper Award
- IEEE Signal Processing Society Distinguished Lecturer 2017-2018
- 2017 IEEE Signal Processing Society Best Paper Award for Message-Passing De-Quantization with Applications to Compressed Sensing
- 2018 IEEE International Conference on Computational Photography Best Poster Award
- 2019 IEEE Signal Processing Society Best Paper Award for Photon-Efficient Computational 3D and Reflectivity Imaging with Single-Photon Detectors
- 2020 IEEE Signal Processing Society Young Author Best Paper Award for A Few Photons Among Many: Unmixing Signal and Noise for Photon-Efficient Active Imaging (co-author with Joshua Rapp)
- 2023 Frontiers of Science Award in Computational Optics for Quantum-inspired computational imaging (Science, 2018)
