= Nicolas Henchoz =

Swiss researcher

Director Nicolas Henchoz
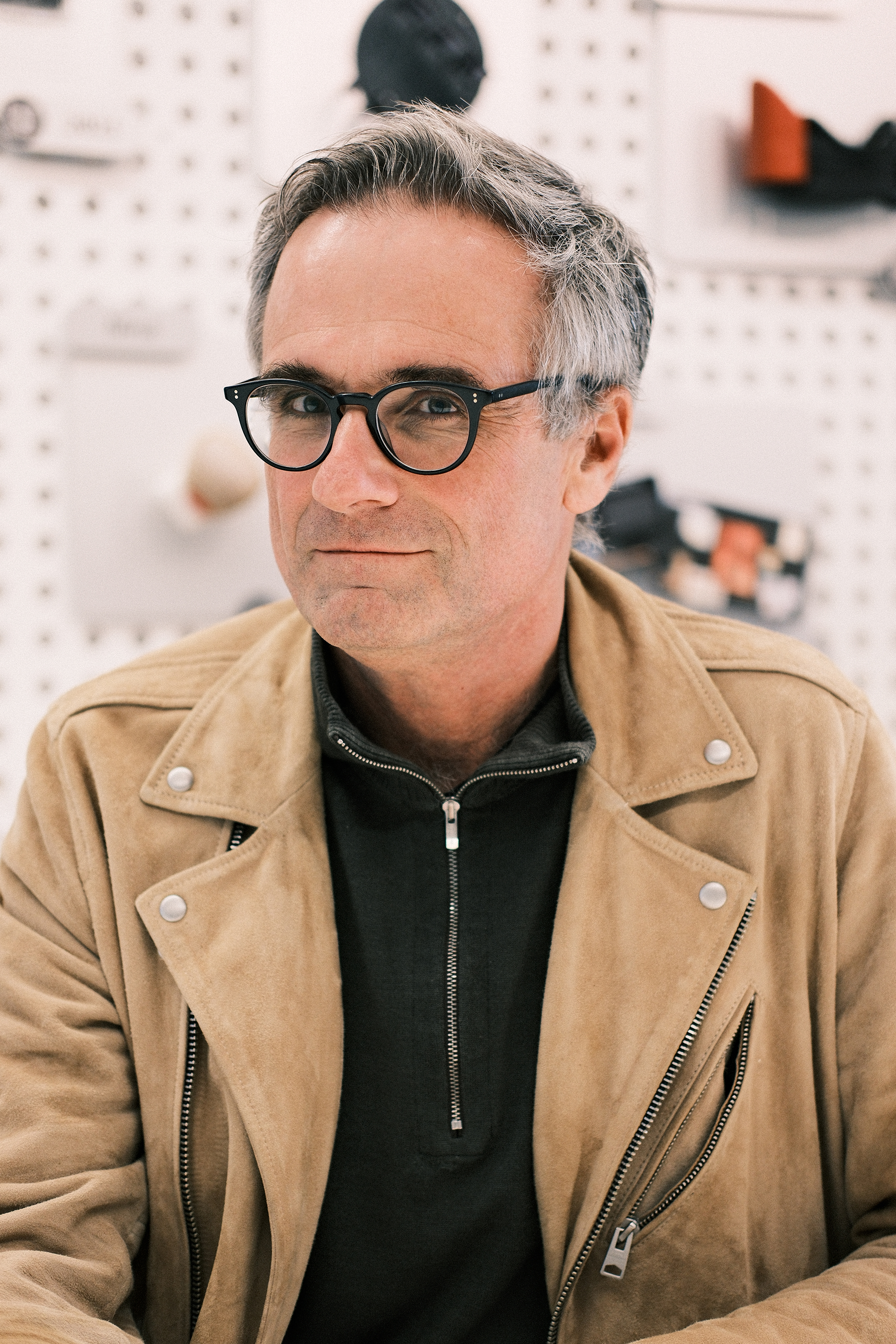
- Nicolas Henchoz in 2025
- Born: 1967 (age 58–59); Lausanne, Switzerland
- Education: Materials science
- Alma mater: EPFL
- Scientific career
- Institutions: École Polytechnique Fédérale de Lausanne (EPFL), ECAL
- Website: https://epfl-ecal-lab.ch/

Nicolas Henchoz (born 1967) is a materials engineer, journalist and art director specialising in innovation processes and design research. He is the founder and director the EPFL+ECAL Lab, a design research centre of the École Polytechnique Fédérale de Lausanne (EPFL).

== Career ==
Born in Lausanne, Nicolas Henchoz studied materials science at the EPFL and graduated with a diploma in 1991.

After training as a journalist, he became science and technology writer in 1992 at the Journal de Genève (now Le Temps). In 1994, he joined Swiss Television, where he collaborated on magazines such as Téléscope. He was in charge of scientific news, and acted as news presenter.

In 2000, he joined the presidency of the EPFL, as Patrick Aebischer's deputy for the institution's image and communication. He was involved in the development the Rolex Learning Center.

In 2004, Henchoz served as a spokesperson for EPFL, stating that the launch of the university’s new Space Center would give the institution greater visibility and help coordinate ongoing research projects.

In partnership with the École cantonale d'art de Lausanne (ECAL), in 2007 he initiated the creation of the EPFL+ECAL Lab.

He was lecturer and visiting professor at ENSCI in Paris, the Royal College of Art in London, Parsons the New School for Design, and the Polytechnic University of Milan. He is also the advisory board member of the MediaFutures project, founded by the European Commission.

In 2023, he was the chairman of the art papers of the SIGGRAPH conference. His work has been featured on RTS.

== Research ==
Henchoz' research interests focus on the fields of design, technology, and innovation. His interdisciplinary work emphasises the integration of cultural creativity with scientific practices to create innovative user experiences and technologies.

In 2010, Henchoz initiated the international design exhibition Sunny Memories, which presented creative ideas for applying a new generation of colored, flexible solar cells developed at EPFL. The exhibition was held at Harvard University and involved students from art and design schools in Lausanne, Paris, London, and San Francisco. At its opening at Harvard University, Swiss Federal Councillor Didier Burkhalter credited Henchoz as the initiator of the project and acknowledged the EPFL+ECAL Lab’s interdisciplinary approach combining design and innovation.

His projects include the digital archiving of the Montreux Jazz Festival and rendering the archive accessible by means of augmented reality. In more general terms, his book "Design for Innovative Technology" discusses the role of design in bridging the gap between innovation and daily life. Integrating digital tools with cultural and spiritual practices, his project "The Ming Shan Digital Experience" blended digital technology and traditional practices like Taoist meditation.

== Distinctions ==
In 2011, Henchoz was named Chevalier des Arts et des Lettres by the French Ministry of Culture, an honor typically awarded to notable figures in cinema, theatre, or literature.

== Publications ==
=== Books ===
- Mirande, Yves; Henchoz, Nicolas (2014). Design for innovative technology: from disruption to acceptance (1. ed.). Lausanne: EPFL Press [u.a.] ISBN 978-1-138-78278-5.
- Andersen, Marilyne; Rey, Emmanuel; Vetterli, Martin; Aebischer, Jean-Nicolas; Epiney, Astrid, eds. (2019). Exploring: Research-driven, building design. Towards 2050. Zürich: Park Books. ISBN 978-3-03860-132-6.
- Douillet, Yoann; Collaud, Romain; Groves, Emily; Sonderegger, Andreas; Duchêne, Cedric; Henchoz, Nicolas (2023). Adapting Haptic Feedback for Guided Meditation. The Eurographics Association. doi:10.2312/imet.20231253. ISBN 978-3-03868-233-2. S2CID 264542138.
