= Anna Fontcuberta i Morral =

Spanish and Swiss physicist and materials scientist

Professor Anna Fontcuberta i Morral
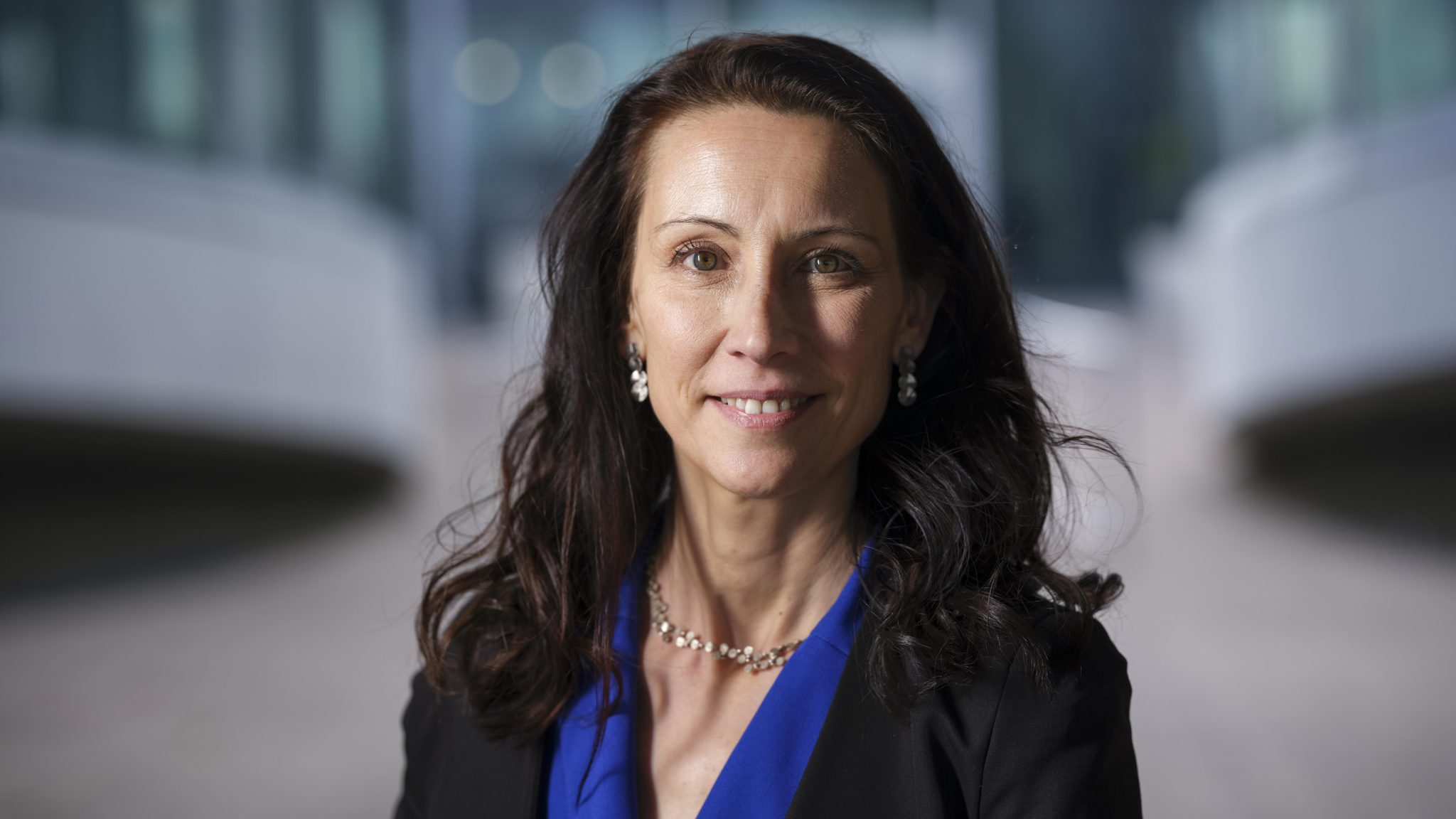
- Prof. Anna Fontcuberta i Morral became president of EPFL in January 2025
- Born: 5 May 1975 (age 51)
- Citizenship: Spain, Switzerland
- Known for: President of the École polytechnique fédérale de Lausanne (from 2025)
- Awards: Rodolphe and Renée Haenny Fondation Prize (2012); EPS Emmy Noether Distinction (2015)

Academic background
- Education: Physics; Material Science
- Alma mater: University of Barcelona; Université Sorbonne Paris Nord; Ecole Polytechnique
- Doctoral advisor: Pere Roca i Cabarrocas
- Other advisor: Harry A. Atwater

Academic work
- Discipline: Physics; Material Science
- Institutions: École Polytechnique Fédérale de Lausanne (EPFL)
- Main interests: Nanotechnology; Semiconductor Nanostructures; Molecular-beam epitaxy Solar cells
- Website: https://www.epfl.ch/about/presidency/

Anna Fontcuberta i Morral is the president of École polytechnique fédérale de Lausanne (EPFL) in Switzerland, succeeding Martin Vetterli. She is a Spanish and Swiss physicist and materials scientist. Her research focuses on nanotechnology applied in the production of solar cells and quantum technologies. She is a full professor at École Polytechnique Fédérale de Lausanne (EPFL) and the head of the Laboratory of Semiconductor Materials.

== Career ==
Fontcuberta i Morral studied physics at University of Barcelona and received her Bachelor's degree in 1997. In the following year she gained a diploma (Diplôme d'Etudes Approfondis, D.E.A.) in materials science from Université Paris-Sud. As a graduate student she joined the group of Pere Roca i Cabarrocas at Ecole Polytechnique in Palaiseau, France, and graduated in 2001 with a PhD in materials science. She then went to the California Institute of Technology to work as postdoctoral scholar with Harry A. Atwater.

In 2003, she became a permanent research fellow at French National Centre for Scientific Research at the École Polytechnique. From 2004 to 2005 she was visiting scientist at California Institute of Technology. During this time she co-founded the startup company Aonex Technologies specialized in layer transfer for the production of multi-junction solar cells. Sponsored by a Marie Curie Excellence Grant she became team leader at the Walter Schottky Institute at the Technical University of Munich in 2005, where she also habilitated in physics in 2009. There, she started her independent research activities on III-V-based nanowires.

In 2008, she joined the Institute of Materials Science & Engineering at the School of Engineering of EPFL as an assistant professor. In 2014 and 2019, she was successively promoted to associate and full professor. She is the founder and head of the Laboratory of Semiconductor Materials. Since January 2021, she is the associate vice-president for Centers and Platforms at EPFL. She also served as the president of the EPFL WISH foundation between 2018 and 2020, a foundation whose goal is to support EPFL female students to excel in their careers.

Starting 1 January 2025, the Swiss Federal Council appointed her as the sixth President of EPFL for a 4-year term, succeeding Martin Vetterli. She is the first woman to hold the position.

Fontcuberta i Morral is a member of the Executive Advisory Board of the World.Minds Foundation, participating in global discussions on science, technology, and education.

== Research ==
Fontcuberta i Morral works on the boundaries of physics, material science and engineering, and focuses on quantum science, renewable energy production and sustainable material design. Her research ventures aim at the synthesis and characterization of semiconductor nano-structures and in particular on nano-wires for the application in new nano-electronic and nano-photonic systems. She studies novel semiconductors based on compounds and alloys such as germanium, germanium-tin, zinc phosphide, III-Arsenic' and III-Antimony

== Distinctions ==
In 2012, she received EPFL's Rodolphe and Renée Haenny Fondation Prize. In 2015, she was awarded the European Physical Society's Emmy Noether Distinction for "noteworthy women physicists".

She has received prestigious research grants from the European Research Council and the Swiss National Science Foundation.

== Selected works ==
- Krogstrup, Peter; Jørgensen, Henrik Ingerslev; Heiss, Martin; Demichel, Olivier; Holm, Jeppe V.; Aagesen, Martin; Nygard, Jesper; Fontcuberta i Morral, Anna (2013). "Single-nanowire solar cells beyond the Shockley–Queisser limit". Nature Photonics. 7 (4): 306–310. arXiv:1301.1068. Bibcode:2013NaPho...7..306K. doi:10.1038/nphoton.2013.32. S2CID 6096888.
- Dumcenco, Dumitru; Ovchinnikov, Dmitry; Marinov, Kolyo; Lazić, Predrag; Gibertini, Marco; Marzari, Nicola; Sanchez, Oriol Lopez; Kung, Yen-Cheng; Krasnozhon, Daria; Chen, Ming-Wei; Bertolazzi, Simone; Gillet, Philippe; Fontcuberta i Morral, Anna; Radenovic, Aleksandra; Kis, Andras (2015). "Large-Area Epitaxial Monolayer MoS2". ACS Nano. 9 (4): 4611–4620. Bibcode:2015ACSNa...9.4611D. doi:10.1021/acsnano.5b01281. PMC 4415455. PMID 25843548.
- Spirkoska, D.; Arbiol, J.; Gustafsson, A.; Conesa-Boj, S.; Glas, F.; Zardo, I.; Heigoldt, M.; Gass, M. H.; Bleloch, A. L.; Estrade, S.; Kaniber, M.; Rossler, J.; Peiro, F.; Morante, J. R.; Abstreiter, G.; Samuelson, L.; Fontcuberta i Morral, A. (2009). "Structural and optical properties of high quality zinc-blende/Wurtzite Ga As nanowire heterostructures". Physical Review B. 80 (24) 245325. arXiv:0907.1444. Bibcode:2009PhRvB..80x5325S. doi:10.1103/PhysRevB.80.245325. S2CID 2683.
- Colombo, C.; Spirkoska, D.; Frimmer, M.; Abstreiter, G.; Fontcuberta i Morral, A. (2008). "Ga-assisted catalyst-free growth mechanism of Ga As nanowires by molecular beam epitaxy". Physical Review B. 77 (15) 155326. Bibcode:2008PhRvB..77o5326C. doi:10.1103/PhysRevB.77.155326.
- Heiss, M.; Fontana, Y.; Gustafsson, A.; Wüst, G.; Magen, C.; o'Regan, D. D.; Luo, J. W.; Ketterer, B.; Conesa-Boj, S.; Kuhlmann, A. V.; Houel, J.; Russo-Averchi, E.; Morante, J. R.; Cantoni, M.; Marzari, N.; Arbiol, J.; Zunger, A.; Warburton, R. J.; Fontcuberta i Morral, A. (2013). "Self-assembled quantum dots in a nanowire system for quantum photonics" (PDF). Nature Materials. 12 (5): 439–444. Bibcode:2013NatMa..12..439H. doi:10.1038/nmat3557. PMID 23377293.
- Escobar Steinvall, Simon; Stutz, Elias Z.; Paul, Rajrupa; Zamani, Mahdi; Dzade, Nelson Y.; Piazza, Valerio; Friedl, Martin; De Mestral, Virginie; Leran, Jean-Baptiste; Zamani, Reza R.; Fontcuberta i Morral, Anna (2021). "Towards defect-free thin films of the earth-abundant absorber zinc phosphide by nanopatterning". Nanoscale Advances. 3 (2): 326–332. Bibcode:2021NanoA...3..326E. doi:10.1039/D0NA00841A. PMC 9418067. PMID 36131749.
- Güniat, Lucas; Caroff, Philippe; Fontcuberta i Morral, Anna (2019). "Vapor Phase Growth of Semiconductor Nanowires: Key Developments and Open Questions". Chemical Reviews. 119 (15): 8958–8971. doi:10.1021/acs.chemrev.8b00649. PMID 30998006.
