= Trev Alberts =

American football player (born 1970)

Texas A&M Aggies
- Title: Athletic director

Personal information
- Born: August 8, 1970 (age 56); Cedar Falls, Iowa, U.S.
- Listed height: 6 ft 4 in (1.93 m)
- Listed weight: 245 lb (111 kg)

Career information
- High school: Northern University (Cedar Falls)
- College: Nebraska
- NFL draft: 1994: 1st round, 5th overall pick

Career history

Playing
- Indianapolis Colts (1994–1996)

Operations
- Omaha (2009–2021) Athletic director; Nebraska (2021–2024) Athletic director; Texas A&M (2024–2026) Athletic director; Michigan (2027–future) Athletic director

Awards and highlights
- Dick Butkus Award (1993); Jack Lambert Trophy (1993); Unanimous All-American (1993); Big Eight Defensive Player of the Year (1993); First-team All-Big Eight (1993); Second-team All-Big Eight (1992); Nebraska Cornhuskers Jersey No. 34 retired

Career NFL statistics
- Tackles: 69
- Forced fumbles: 3
- Interceptions: 1
- Stats at Pro Football Reference
- College Football Hall of Fame

Trev Kendall Alberts (born August 8, 1970) is an American sports administrator and former professional football linebacker who is the athletic director at Texas A&M University. He will leave in 2027 to take the same role at the University of Michigan. He previously played in the National Football League (NFL) for three seasons with the Indianapolis Colts. Alberts was also the athletic director at the University of Nebraska Omaha from 2009 to 2021, and the University of Nebraska–Lincoln from 2021 to 2024.

Alberts played college football for the Nebraska Cornhuskers, winning the Dick Butkus Award and Jack Lambert Trophy as a senior. He was selected fifth overall by the Colts in the 1994 NFL draft, but his professional career was cut short by injuries. Alberts was inducted to the College Football Hall of Fame in 2015.

Following his playing career, Alberts began to work in sports administration. He held his first athletic director position at the University of Nebraska's Omaha campus for 13 years before returning to his alma mater's flagship campus in Lincoln to lead the athletic department for four years. Alberts became the athletic director at Texas A&M in 2024.

== Early life ==
Alberts was born in Cedar Falls, Iowa. He has a brother and sister. Trev Alberts attended Northern University High School in Cedar Falls, where he played for the Northern University Panthers high school football team.

== Career ==
=== College ===
While attending the University of Nebraska, he played for the Nebraska Cornhuskers football team from 1990 to 1993. Following his senior season in 1993, he was awarded the Dick Butkus Award and Jack Lambert Trophy as the top college linebacker; Alberts was also recognized as a consensus first-team All-American, after recording 15 quarterback sacks, 21 tackles for loss, and 38 quarterback hurries. Despite an injury early in the eleventh game of the season against the Oklahoma Sooners, Alberts returned with a cast on his arm for the national championship game against Florida State in the Orange Bowl. Although the Seminoles won 18–16, Alberts had a dominant performance with three sacks of Heisman Trophy-winner Charlie Ward (FSU quarterbacks were sacked only five times during the 1993 regular season).

=== Professional ===
Pre-draft measurables
Height	Weight	Arm length	Hand span
6 ft 4 in (1.93 m)	243 lb (110 kg)	32 3/4 in (0.83 m)	9 1/4 in (0.23 m)

Selected in the first round with the fifth overall pick in the 1994 draft, Alberts began his professional career with the Indianapolis Colts and continued to play for the Colts from 1994 to 1996. Due to injuries he played portions of just three seasons before retiring before the 1997 season, tallying just four career quarterback sacks and one interception.

=== Broadcasting ===
Upon retirement from the NFL, Alberts was hired by the American cable television network CNN/SI and concomitantly its Sports Illustrated magazine, where he served as a college football contributor. In 2002, Alberts joined the staff of the American cable television network ESPN, where he worked as an in-studio analyst for college football, ultimately joining Rece Davis and Mark May on the network's College GameDay Scoreboard and College GameDay Final.

On September 6, 2005, Alberts was terminated by ESPN for breaching his contract when he declined to report to work; Alberts later claimed he did not want to "play second fiddle" to the more prominent cast of College GameDay, Chris Fowler, Kirk Herbstreit and Lee Corso.

Alberts thereafter accepted a position as a columnist for the website of the college sports cable television network CSTV. He worked as a color commentator for the NFL on Westwood One Sunday afternoon radio broadcasts in 2006. He also provided color commentary for SEC football games on CBS.

Alberts also served as an analyst for Sprint Exclusive Entertainment, breaking down college football and other sports for viewers.

=== Administrative career ===
Omaha

Alberts was hired in April 2009 to be the director of athletics for the Omaha Mavericks sports program at the University of Nebraska-Omaha.

I believe the potential for UNO's athletic programs is unlimited. This new chapter in my life will be exciting for me and for my family. I had an amazing experience as a college athlete. For several years now, I’ve wanted to return to college athletics and give something back. This position at UNO is a privilege.
—Alberts upon assuming the UNO job

Alberts made the controversial decision to eliminate football and wrestling to bring University of Nebraska-Omaha to Division I's Summit League. The regents approved the move March 25, 2011.

Nebraska

On July 14, 2021, the University of Nebraska–Lincoln announced Alberts as its next athletic director.

On September 11, 2022, Alberts fired football head coach Scott Frost. The move was seen as ill-timed as Frost's buyout would have been almost $8 million less if Alberts had waited three weeks.

Texas A&M

On March 13, 2024, Texas A&M University announced Alberts had been hired as its new athletic director, replacing Ross Bjork, who took the same position at Ohio State.

Michigan

On Nov 18, 2026, The University of Michigan announced Alberts had been hired as its new athletic director.
