= Živorad Kovačević =

Yugoslav and Serbian politician (1930-2011)

Živorad Kovačević Живорад Ковачевић
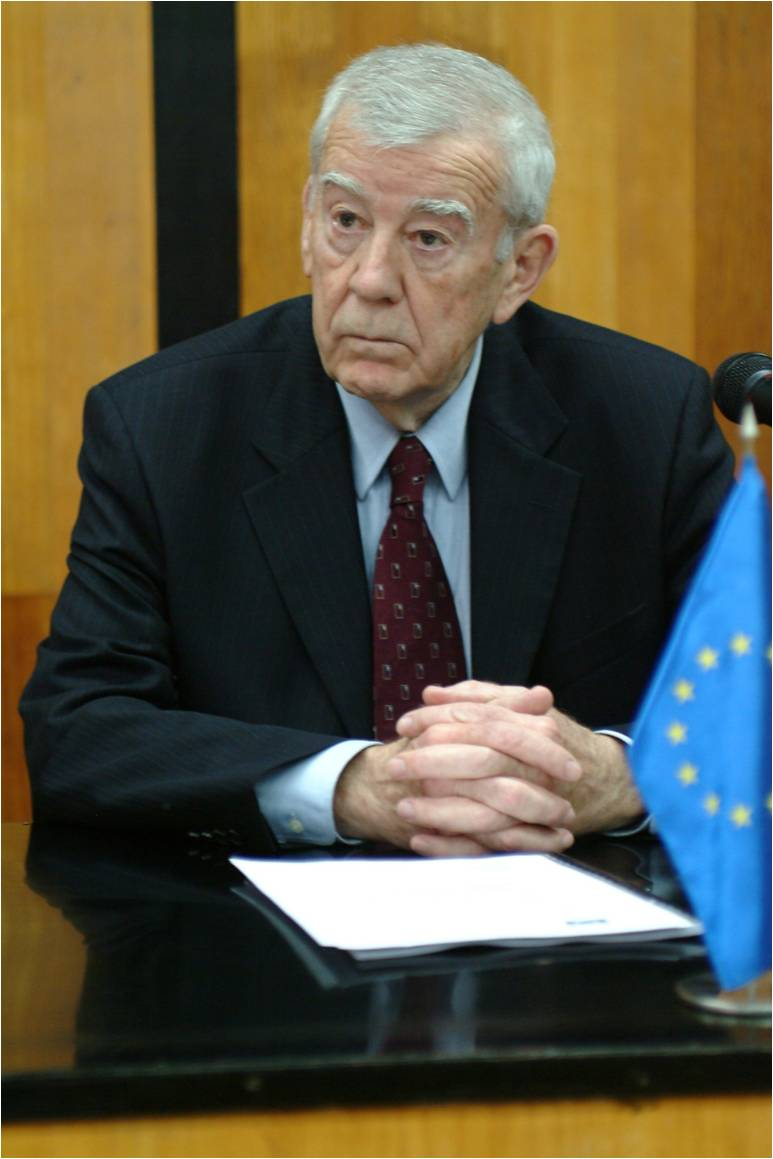
- Born: 30 May 1930; Jagodina, Kingdom of Yugoslavia
- Died: 23 March 2011 (aged 80); Belgrade, Serbia
- Resting place: Belgrade New Cemetery
- Political party: League of Communists of Yugoslavia
- Spouse: Margita Kovačević
- Children: Jelena Kovačević

Živorad Kovačević (Serbian Cyrillic Живорад Ковачевић; 30 May 1930 – 23 March 2011) was a Yugoslav and Serbian diplomat, politician, NGO activist, academic and writer.

== Biography ==
=== Early life and education ===
Živorad Kovačević was born in Jagodina, Kingdom of Yugoslavia (present-day Serbia), to Ilija, who spent World War II as a prisoner in Mauthausen, and Darinka. His older brother, Radovan, was killed by Germans in Jagodina in 1941. He was survived by an older sister, Stojanka. He was educated at the all-male Gymnasium "Šesta Muška" in Belgrade, and subsequently at the Journalist Diplomatic Academy (Viša Novinarsko-Diplomatska Škola), graduating in 1952. He received an M.A. in political science from the University of California, Berkeley in 1961 and specialized in international relations at Harvard University in 1963.

=== Political career ===
Kovačević held positions as Editor-in-Chief of the magazine Komuna (1954–1962), Director of Public Administration Institute (1962–1964), Vice-Secretary of the Executive Council of Serbia (1964–1967), and Secretary General of the Standing Conference of Towns and Municipalities (1967–1973).

He served as Deputy Mayor and then Mayor of Belgrade from 1974 to 1982. During his tenure, Sava Centar was built in time to host the Conference on Security and Co-operation in Europe, as well as the Hotel InterContinental for the meeting of the International Monetary Fund and the World Bank. Many other projects were carried out during this period, most notably, Ada Ciganlija and Klinički Centar Srbije (Serbian Clinical Center). Kovačević was quoted as being proud that between 10,000 and 12,000 apartments were built annually in the capital during his term. As mayor, he also oversaw the erection of a monument to Karađorđe (the leader of the First Serbian Uprising against the Turks) on the great lawn in front of the National Library of Serbia.

From 1982 to 1986, Kovačević served as a Minister in the government of Milka Planinc, the Prime Minister of Yugoslavia who initiated economic reforms. In the federal government, he served as a member of the Federal Executive Council and President of the Foreign Affairs Commission, roles that led to a more international focus in his career.

Kovačević was appointed Ambassador of Yugoslavia to the United States in 1987 but was recalled in 1989 following his open criticism in Washington of Slobodan Milosević's policy. He notably met six American presidents: John F. Kennedy, Richard Nixon, Gerald Ford, Jimmy Carter, Ronald Reagan, and George Bush; and five Secretaries of State: Henry Kissinger, Cyrus Vance, George P. Shultz, James Baker, and Lawrence Eagleburger. His personal contribution as ambassador was widely acknowledged for facilitating the transfer of Nikola Tesla's assets from the United States to Belgrade.

=== NGO activities ===
After his recall as Ambassador to the United States in 1989, Kovačević retired from the Ministry of Foreign Affairs and spent the rest of his life as an NGO activist and advocate for Serbia's integration into the European Union. He presided over the Forum on International Relations. In 1994, he joined the European Movement in Serbia, becoming its president in 1999, a position he held until his death.

Based on his personal account, Kovačević was offered the post of Foreign Minister in the Government of Milan Panić in 1992, but was prevented by Borisav Jović from taking it.

Kovačević was one of the founders of the Igman Initiative, which brings together 140 organizations in the countries that emerged from the dissolution of Yugoslavia, often referred to as the 'Dayton Triangle' (Serbia, Montenegro, Croatia, and Bosnia and Herzegovina). The Igman Initiative launched a "mini-Schengen" project aimed at fostering relations among these countries, similar to those within the European Union, particularly regarding a visa-free regime. The organization's founding followed Kovačević's efforts, notably in April 1995, when he led a group of 38 anti-war intellectuals and activists from FR Yugoslavia across Mount Igman to support the citizens of Sarajevo during the siege.

Kovačević was the first President of the Foreign Relations Council of the Ministry of Foreign Affairs of the Republic of Serbia, established in 2007.

=== Academic activities ===
In addition to his work promoting democratic relations in Serbia and elsewhere, Kovačević was a prolific writer. Building on his passion for languages, he published the first dictionary of idioms (both English-Serbian and Serbian-English). He also published one of his most popular works, "Lažni prijatelji u engleskom jeziku: zamke doslovnog prevođenja" (False Friends in the English Language: Traps of Literal Translation), and several titles on international relations and negotiation. He taught international negotiations at the Diplomatic Academy and the Department of Political Sciences in Belgrade and Podgorica, and frequently lectured on U.S. foreign policy and the breakup of Yugoslavia. He delivered his last lecture a week before his death.

=== Awards ===
In 2000, Kovačević was awarded The Elise and Walter A. Haas International Award that "honors an alumnus of the University of California, Berkeley who is a native, citizen, and resident of a nation other than the United States of America, and who has a distinguished record of service to his or her country.

=== Personal life ===
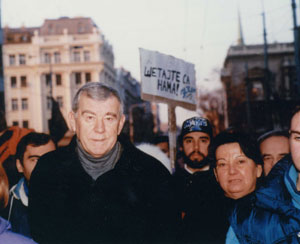
Živorad and Margita Kovačević walking with students in Belgrade in 1997. The sign behind them says "Walk with us."

Živorad Kovačević was married for over fifty years to Margita Kovačević, who died only three months before him. They shared both their lives and beliefs. Margita supported him throughout his career and activism, including participating in demonstrations during the protest the local election fraud during the rule of Slobodan Milošević. "Rain or shine we went there every day for 88 days," Kovačević said.

His daughter, Jelena Kovačević, an accomplished American engineer and scientist, is presently the William R. Berkley Professor and was the Dean of the NYU Tandon School of Engineering.

=== Death ===
Kovačević committed suicide on 23 March 2011 in his apartment in Vračar, Belgrade. He was interred in the Belgrade New Cemetery on 26 March 2011.

== Published books ==
- Kovačević, Živorad (1991). Srpsko-engleski rečnik idioma, izraza i izreka. ISBN 86-7363-118-1.
- Kovačević, Živorad (1997). Englesko-srpski frazeološki rečnik. ISBN 86-7363-201-3.
- Milosavljević, Bogoljub (2000). SAD i jugoslovenska kriza. ISBN 86-82297-39-6.
- Kovačević, Živorad (2002). Srpsko-engleski frazeološki rečnik. ISBN 86-7363-322-2.
- Englesko-srpski frazeološki rečnik (drugo izmenjeno i dopunjeno izdanje). 2002. ISBN 86-7363-338-9.
- Kovačević, Živorad (2004). Između arogancije i poniznosti: Srbija i svet. ISBN 86-7208-092-0.
- Kovačević, Živorad (2004). Međunarodno pregovaranje. ISBN 86-7363-391-5.
- Kovačević, Živorad (2007). Amerika i raspad Jugoslavije. ISBN 978-86-7363-536-1.
- Kovačević, Živorad (2009). Lažni prijatelji u engleskom jeziku: zamke doslovnog prevođenja. ISBN 978-86-608-1001-6.
