= Northern University High School =

Location
- 1901 Campus Street; Cedar Falls, Iowa; United States

Information
- Type: Laboratory school
- Established: 1954
- Closed: 2012
- Colors: Orange and Black
- Mascot: Panther
- Affiliation: North Iowa Cedar-East Conference
- Website: www.uni.edu/iowa-rds

Northern University High School was a small high school in Cedar Falls, Iowa, United States, run by the University of Northern Iowa. It comprised grades 9-12 of the Pk-12 Malcolm Price Laboratory School. It closed in July 2012 under controversy and university budget cuts. It was mostly demolished in June 2013, save for the athletics Wing; part of this wing was re-purposed into the UNI Childhood Development center, previously housed in the building's east wing.

== Athletics ==
- Basketball
  - 2008 IHSAA Boys' Class 1A State Champions
- Golf
  - 2008 IHSAA Boys' class 1A State Champions
- Cross Country
  - 3-times IHSAA Boys' Class 1A State Champions (1984, 1985, 2010)
- Track and Field
- Iowa School of Character awards (2007 and 2008).

In earlier years, the school was known for football, for 21 years under coach John Aldrich (1955–1976). Playing the single-wing offense, the team compiled a 120–49 record under Coach Aldrich, who was a member of the Iowa High School Coaches Hall of Fame.

== Information Technology ==
Northern University won multiple Information Technology competitions in the Cyber Defense category. In 2008, 2009, 2010, and 2011 the school won first place in the Cyber Defense category of the IT-Olympics held at Iowa State University.

== Fine arts ==
Despite its small size, students from Northern University High School were consistently accepted into the Iowa All State Orchestra, Band and Choir.

== Scandal ==
The school became a subject of controversy in July 2009 after local media agencies reported that nine families had defrauded the school in order to receive discounted tuition. One person implicated in this scandal is Iowa State Representative Kerry Burt.

== Notable alumni ==
- Trev Alberts, American football player
- Annabeth Gish, American actress
- Vivek Goyal, American engineering professor, author, and inventor
- Gary Kroeger, American actor
- Ras Smith, American politician
