= Jelena Kovačević =

Serbian American engineering professor

- Born: Belgrade
- Education: University of Belgrade (BEE); Columbia University (PhD)
- Occupation: Professor at NYU’s Tandon School of Engineering
- Known for: Books : "Wavelets and Subband Coding" and "Foundations of Signal Processing"
- Father: Živorad Kovačević

Academic background
- Doctoral advisor: Martin Vetterli

Jelena Kovačević is a Serbian American engineering professor at the New York University Tandon School of Engineering. She served as dean of the school from 2018-2024.

== Education ==
Kovačević received her Engineering Diploma Degree in electrical engineering from the University of Belgrade and her MS and PhD from Columbia University, under doctoral advisor Martin Vetterli, with whom she later co-authored multiple books on signal processing and wavelet theory.

== Career ==
From 1991-2002, Kovačević was with Bell Labs, Murray Hill, NJ. Subsequently she joined Carnegie Mellon University, where she was the Hamerschlag University Professor and Head of Electrical and Computer Engineering and Professor of Biomedical Engineering.

In 2018 Kovačević was named Dean of the NYU Tandon School of Engineering, the first woman to hold this position in the school's 164-year history. During her tenure, NYU committed to investing $1 Billion into the engineering school to improve its ranking among competitors and raise New York City’s profile in the technology sector. At the end of her five-year term in May 2023, she announced she would be stepping down on August 31, 2024.

Kovačević is an elected fellow of the IEEE and EURASIP. She is a recipient of the "Belgrade October Prize," the "E.I. Jury Award" from Columbia University, the "CIT Philip L. Dowd Fellowship Award" from Carnegie Mellon University, the IEEE Signal Processing Society Technical Achievement Award in 2016, and the IEEE Engineering in Medicine & Biology Society (EMBS) Career Achievement Award in 2022.

== Family ==
Jelena Kovačević was born to Margita Kovačević and Živorad Kovačević, the latter of whom was a Yugoslav politician, diplomat, and academic, who was the 60th Mayor of Belgrade in 1974-1982 and Yugoslavia's Ambassador to the United States in 1987-1989, when he was recalled after his disapproval of Slobodan Milosević's regime.
