= Aleksandra Radenovic =

Swiss-Croatian bioengineer

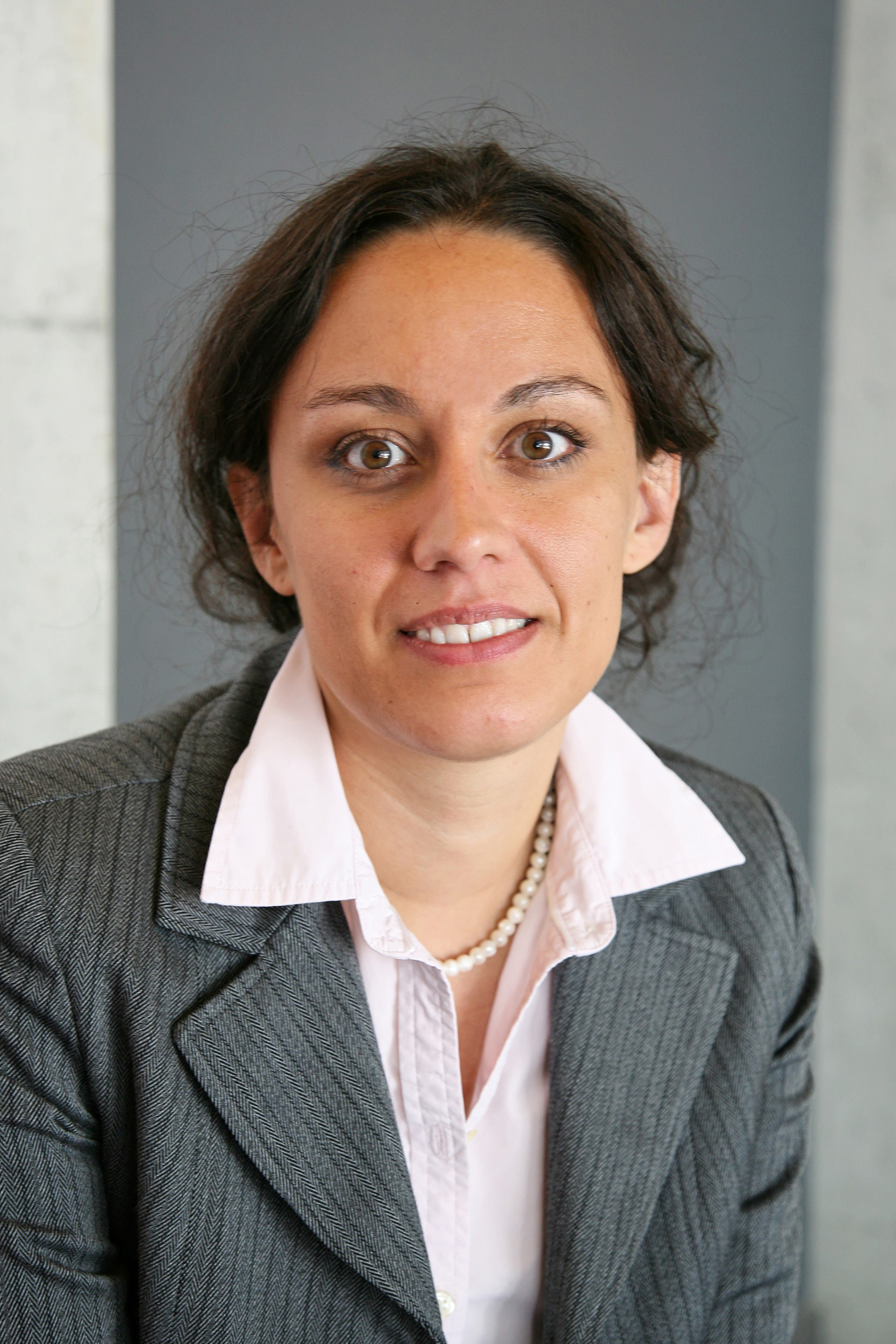
- Aleksandra Radenovic in 2007
- Born: 1975 (age 50–51)
- Citizenship: Switzerland; Croatia

Academic background
- Education: Physics
- Alma mater: University of Zagreb; University of Lausanne
- Thesis: Development of low temperature atomic force microscope for biological applications (2003)
- Doctoral advisor: Giovanni Dietler
- Other advisor: Jan Liphardt

Academic work
- Discipline: Biological engineering Biophysics; Nanofluidics; Microscopy; Cell biology
- Institutions: École Polytechnique Fédérale de Lausanne (EPFL)
- Main interests: Single molecule biophysics Solid State Nanopores; 2-D materials Optical tweezers Second-harmonic generation Super-resolution microscopy
- Website: https://lben.epfl.ch/

Aleksandra Radenovic (born in 1975 in Croatia) is a Swiss and Croatian biophysicist. Her research focuses on the development of experimental tools to study single-molecule biophysics. She is a professor of biological engineering at the École Polytechnique Fédérale de Lausanne (EPFL) and head of the Laboratory of Nanoscale Biology.

== Career ==
Radenovic studied physics at the University of Zagreb, where she wrote her Master thesis on Raman spectroscopy of Beta-Carotene. She then joined Giovanni Dietler's Laboratory of Physics of Living Matter, then located at University of Lausanne, and in 2003, she graduated with a PhD on cryo atomic force microscopy. For postdoctoral studies she went to work at University of California, Berkeley with Jan Liphardt. In 2008, she became an assistant professor at EPFL where she established the Laboratory of Nanoscale Biology. In 2015, she was promoted as an associate professor.

== Research ==
Radenovic's area of research is the development of experimental techniques for the study of molecular and cell biology making use of biosensors and optical imaging. In particular, she is interested in single-molecule biophysics.

Her research follows three main trajectories. First, she employs nanopores applied on suspended 2D material membranes, standard silicon-nitride membranes, and in glass nanocapillaries to study and manipulate single molecules. Then, Radenovic studies the function of single molecules, especially protein and nucleic acid interactions, via optical tweezers, optical wrench system, anti-Brownian electrokinetic trap, and a combination of nanopores or nanocapillaries with optical tweezers. Finally, based on single molecule localization microscopy, she designs super-resolution optical microscopes to extract quantitative information on single molecules.

== Selected publications ==
- Comtet, Jean; Grosjean, Benoit; Glushkov, Evgenii; Avsar, Ahmet; Watanabe, Kenji; Taniguchi, Takashi; Vuilleumier, Rodolphe; Bocquet, Marie-Laure; Radenovic, Aleksandra (2020). "Direct observation of water-mediated single-proton transport between HBN surface defects". Nature Nanotechnology. 15 (7): 598–604. arXiv:1906.09019. Bibcode:2020NatNa..15..598C. doi:10.1038/s41565-020-0695-4. PMID 32451503. S2CID 195316901.
- Descloux, A.; Grußmayer, K. S.; Radenovic, A. (2019). "Parameter-free image resolution estimation based on decorrelation analysis" (PDF). Nature Methods. 16 (9): 918–924. doi:10.1038/s41592-019-0515-7. PMID 31451766. S2CID 201090412.
- Macha, Michal; Marion, Sanjin; Nandigana, Vishal V. R.; Radenovic, Aleksandra (2019). "2D materials as an emerging platform for nanopore-based power generation". Nature Reviews Materials. 4 (9): 588–605. Bibcode:2019NatRM...4..588M. doi:10.1038/s41578-019-0126-z. S2CID 199466502.
- Graf, Michael; Lihter, Martina; Unuchek, Dmitrii; Sarathy, Aditya; Leburton, Jean-Pierre; Kis, Andras; Radenovic, Aleksandra (2019). "Light-Enhanced Blue Energy Generation Using MoS2 Nanopores". Joule. 3 (6): 1549–1564. arXiv:1902.00410. doi:10.1016/j.joule.2019.04.011. S2CID 119079145.
- Comtet, Jean; Glushkov, Evgenii; Navikas, Vytautas; Feng, Jiandong; Babenko, Vitaliy; Hofmann, Stephan; Watanabe, Kenji; Taniguchi, Takashi; Radenovic, Aleksandra (2019). "Wide-Field Spectral Super-Resolution Mapping of Optically Active Defects in Hexagonal Boron Nitride". Nano Letters. 19 (4): 2516–2523. arXiv:1901.06989. Bibcode:2019NanoL..19.2516C. doi:10.1021/acs.nanolett.9b00178. PMID 30865468. S2CID 76661899.
- Feng, Jiandong; Deschout, Hendrik; Caneva, Sabina; Hofmann, Stephan; Lončarić, Ivor; Lazić, Predrag; Radenovic, Aleksandra (2018). "Imaging of Optically Active Defects with Nanometer Resolution". Nano Letters. 18 (3): 1739–1744. arXiv:1706.06313. Bibcode:2018NanoL..18.1739F. doi:10.1021/acs.nanolett.7b04819. PMID 29393651. S2CID 46883656.
- Feng, Jiandong; Liu, Ke; Graf, Michael; Dumcenco, Dumitru; Kis, Andras; Di Ventra, Massimiliano; Radenovic, Aleksandra (2016). "Observation of ionic Coulomb blockade in nanopores" (PDF). Nature Materials. 15 (8): 850–855. Bibcode:2016NatMa..15..850F. doi:10.1038/nmat4607. PMID 27019385.
- Feng, Jiandong; Graf, Michael; Liu, Ke; Ovchinnikov, Dmitry; Dumcenco, Dumitru; Heiranian, Mohammad; Nandigana, Vishal; Aluru, Narayana R.; Kis, Andras; Radenovic, Aleksandra (2016). "Single-layer MoS2 nanopores as nanopower generators" (PDF). Nature. 536 (7615): 197–200. Bibcode:2016Natur.536..197F. doi:10.1038/nature18593. PMID 27409806. S2CID 4447903.
- Feng, Jiandong; Liu, Ke; Bulushev, Roman D.; Khlybov, Sergey; Dumcenco, Dumitru; Kis, Andras; Radenovic, Aleksandra (2015). "Identification of single nucleotides in MoS2 nanopores". Nature Nanotechnology. 10 (12): 1070–1076. arXiv:1505.01608. Bibcode:2015NatNa..10.1070F. doi:10.1038/nnano.2015.219. PMID 26389660. S2CID 8087282.
- Traversi, F.; Raillon, C.; Benameur, S. M.; Liu, K.; Khlybov, S.; Tosun, M.; Krasnozhon, D.; Kis, A.; Radenovic, A. (2013). "Detecting the translocation of DNA through a nanopore using graphene nanoribbons" (PDF). Nature Nanotechnology. 8 (12): 939–945. Bibcode:2013NatNa...8..939T. doi:10.1038/nnano.2013.240. PMID 24240429.
