= Germanium-tin =

Chemical alloy

Germanium-tin is an alloy of the elements germanium and tin, both located in group 14 of the periodic table. It is only thermodynamically stable under a small composition range. Despite this limitation, it has useful properties for band gap and strain engineering of silicon-integrated optoelectronic and microelectronic semiconductor devices.

== Synthesis ==
Germanium-tin alloys must be kinetically stabilized in order to prevent decomposition. Therefore, low temperature molecular beam epitaxy or chemical vapor deposition techniques are typically used for their synthesis.

== Microelectronic applications ==
Germanium-tin alloys have higher carrier mobilities than either silicon or germanium. Therefore, it has been proposed that they can be used as a channel material in high speed metal-oxide-semiconductor field effect transistors. In addition, the alloys' larger lattice constant relative to germanium makes it possible to use them as stressors to enhance the carrier mobility of germanium channel transistors.

== Optoelectronic applications ==
At a Sn content beyond approximately 9%, germanium-tin alloys become direct gap semiconductors having efficient light emission suitable for the fabrication of lasers. Since the constituent elements are chemically compatible with silicon, it is possible to integrate such lasers directly onto silicon microelectronic devices, enabling on-chip optical communication. This is still an active research area, but germanium-tin lasers operating at low temperatures have already been demonstrated. In addition, germanium-tin light emitting diodes operating at room temperature have also been reported.
