= Patrick Aebischer =

Swiss neuroscientist

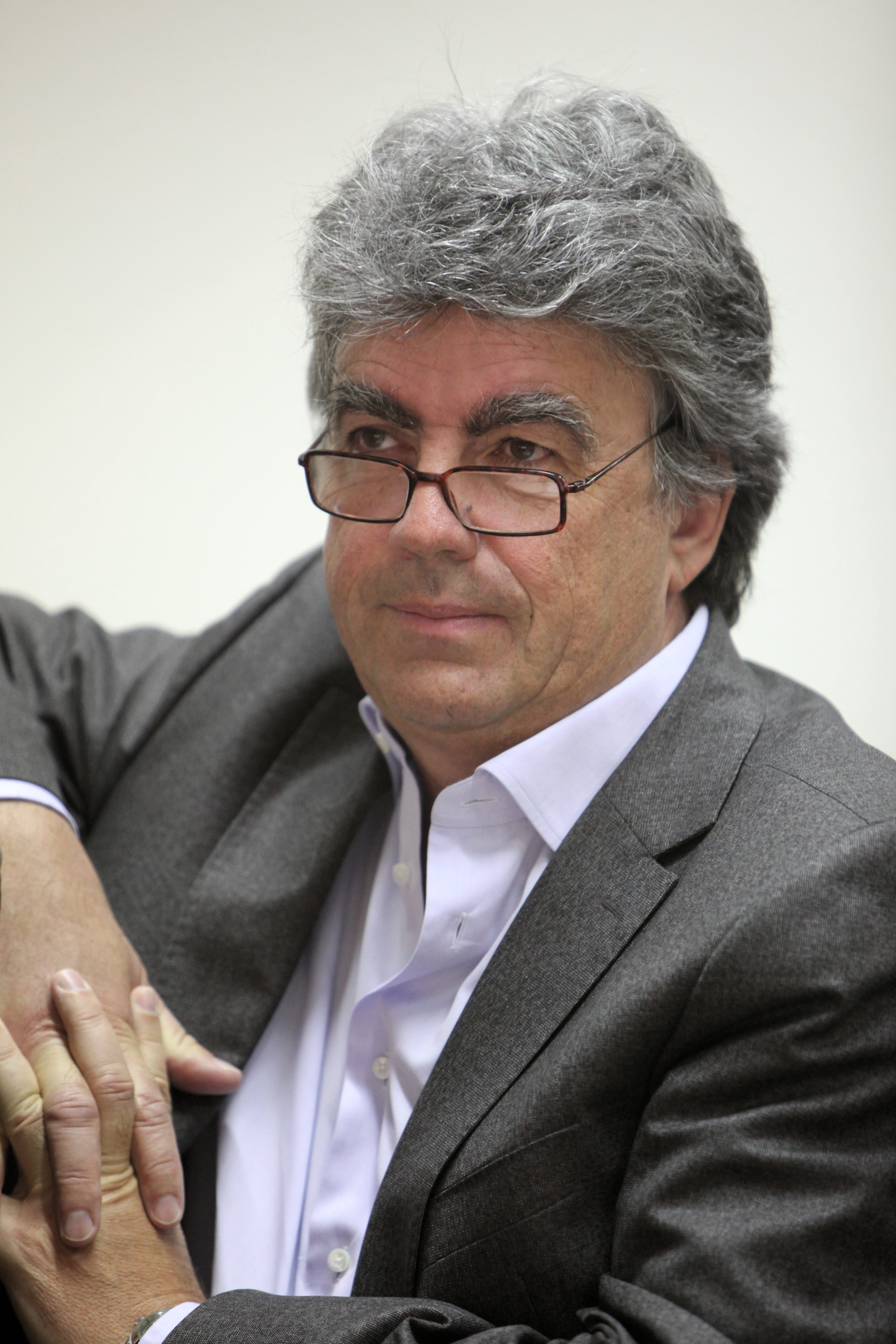
- Born: 22 November 1954 (age 71); Fribourg (Switzerland)
- Education: University of Geneva; Brown University; École polytechnique fédérale de Lausanne
- Known for: President of the École polytechnique fédérale de Lausanne (2000-2016)

Patrick Aebischer (born 22 November 1954 in Fribourg, Switzerland) was the president of the École polytechnique fédérale de Lausanne (EPFL) from 17 March 2000 to 31 December 2016. He is a professor in neuroscience and head of the Neurodegenerative Disease Laboratory at the EPFL.

== Education ==
Aebischer was trained as an MD (1980) and a neuroscientist (Dr. Med., 1983) at the University of Geneva and University of Fribourg in Switzerland.

== Academic career ==
From 1984 to 1992, he worked at Brown University in Providence (Rhode Island, United States), as Research Scientist, Assistant and then associate professor of Medical Sciences. In 1991, he became the chairman of the Section of Artificial Organs, Biomaterials and Cellular Technology of the Division of Biology and Medicine of Brown University.

In autumn 1992, he returned to Switzerland as a professor and director of the Surgical Research Division and Gene Therapy Center at the University Hospital of Lausanne (CHUV) in Lausanne.

In 1999, Aebischer was nominated President of the École polytechnique fédérale de Lausanne (EPFL), one of the two Swiss Federal Institutes of Technology, by the Swiss Federal Council. He took office as president in March 2000 and was reelected to this position in 2004 and 2008. He has decided to leave this position at the end of 2016. Since 1 January 2017, the president of the EPFL is Martin Vetterli.

His current research focuses on the development of cell and gene transfer approaches for the treatment of neurodegenerative diseases.

Aebischer was influenced and inspired by the "American model" of university management, which he describes as a meritocratic system that encourages innovation. Some employees and observers criticised the mutation from a European model to an American model (with values such as money, competition and rankings).

Aebischer is a founder of three start-ups: CytoTherapeutics Inc. (1989), Modex Therapeutics Inc. (1996) and Amazentis SA (2007). He sits on the boards of Nestle Health Science (since 2011) and Lonza Group (since 2008).

== Personal life ==
The parents of Aebischer are artists Émile Aebischer, known as Yoki, and Joan, born O'Boyle. He is married and the father of two children.

== Honours ==
- Fellowship of the Swiss National Science Foundation (1984–1986).
- Kolff Award, young investigator award of the American Society for Artificial Internal Organs, New York, 1987.
- Robert Bing Award of the Swiss Academy of Medical Sciences (1994).
- Pfizer Foundation award for clinical neurosciences (1997).
- Fellow of the Swiss Academy of Medical Sciences (since 1998).
- Fellow of the American Institute for Medical and Biological Engineering (since 2000).
- Fellow of the Swiss Academy of Engineering Sciences (SATW) (since 2009).

== See also ==
=== Bibliography ===
- (in French) Fabrice Delaye, Patrick Aebischer, Éditions Favre, 2016, 192 pages (ISBN 978-2-8289-1484-4).
- (in French) Libero Zuppiroli, La bulle universitaire. Faut-il poursuivre le rêve américain ? [The academic bubble. Should we pursue the American dream?], Éditions d'en bas, 2010, 176 pages (ISBN 978-2-8290-0385-1). The first part, entitled "Le parcours exemplaire du Swiss Institute of Technology Lausanne" [The exemplary path of the Swiss Institute of Technology in Lausanne], is about the change of the EPFL after the appointment of Patrick Aebischer as president.

=== External links ===
- Personal page of Patrick Aebischer on the EPFL website
- Neurodegenerative Disease Laboratory
