= Martin Vetterli =

Swiss engineering academic

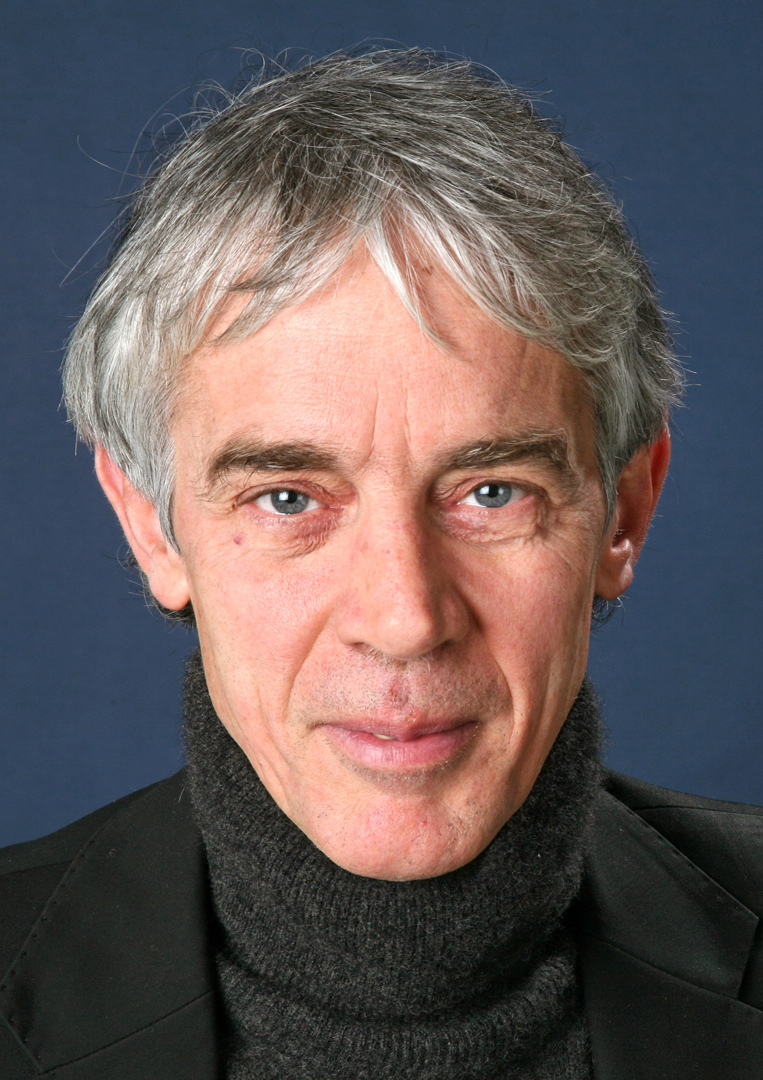
- Former president of the École Polytechnique Fédérale de Lausanne (EPFL)
- Born: 4 October 1957 (age 68)
- Education: ETH Zurich; Stanford University; École polytechnique fédérale de Lausanne
- Known for: Wavelets; President of the École polytechnique fédérale de Lausanne (2017-2024)
- Scientific career
- Fields: Mathematical signal processing
- Workplaces: École polytechnique fédérale de Lausanne
- Doctoral advisor: Henri J. Nussbaumer
- Doctoral students: Minh Do; Jelena Kovačević; Vivek Goyal; Hyung Ju Park
- Website: https://people.epfl.ch/martin.vetterli

Martin Vetterli is a professor of engineering of École polytechnique fédérale de Lausanne (EPFL) in Switzerland, and was the former president of EPFL between 2017 and 2024. He was also formerly the president of the National Research Council of the Swiss National Science Foundation.

Martin Vetterli has made numerous research contributions in the general area of digital signal processing and is best known for his work on wavelets. He has also contributed to other areas, including sampling (signal processing), computational complexity theory, signal processing for communications, digital video processing and joint source/channel coding. His work has led to over 150 journal publications and to two dozen of patents.

== Career ==
Martin Vetterli received his electrical engineering degree from ETH Zurich in 1981, and then completed a Master of Science degree in electrical engineering at Stanford University in 1982. He later pursued his PhD at EPFL in 1986.

After his dissertation, he was an assistant and associate professor in electrical engineering at Columbia University in New York, and in 1993, he became an associate and then full professor at the Department of Electrical Engineering and Computer Sciences at the University of California at Berkeley in California.

In 1995, he joined EPFL as a full-time professor. He held several positions there, including chair of communication systems and founding director of the National Competence Center in Research on Mobile Information and Communication systems (NCCR-MICS).

From 2004 to 2011, he was vice president of EPFL for international affairs and, from 2011 to 2012, he was the dean of the School of Computer and Communications Sciences at EPFL.

In 2015, he was elected to the United States National Academy of Engineering as an International Member for his contributions to the development of time-frequency representations and algorithms in multimedia signal processing and communications.

From 2013 to 2016 he was the president of the National Research Council of the Swiss National Science Foundation, before being elected as the president of EPFL in Switzerland.

He is also responsible for developing, publishing and maintaining an extensive massive open online course on the basics of digital signal processing. The course is a collaboration effort between him and his colleague, Paolo Prandoni. The course was first offered in February 2013 on Coursera and has been offered every year on the site since then. Each session runs for 10 weeks.

=== Scientific contributions ===
Martin Vetterli works in the areas of electrical engineering, computer science and applied mathematics. His work covers wavelets and applications, image and video compression (data compression), self-organized communications systems and sensor networks, as well as fast algorithms.

Signal processing

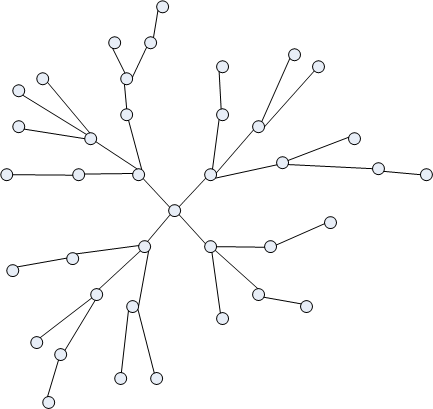
Communication networks

Audio processing

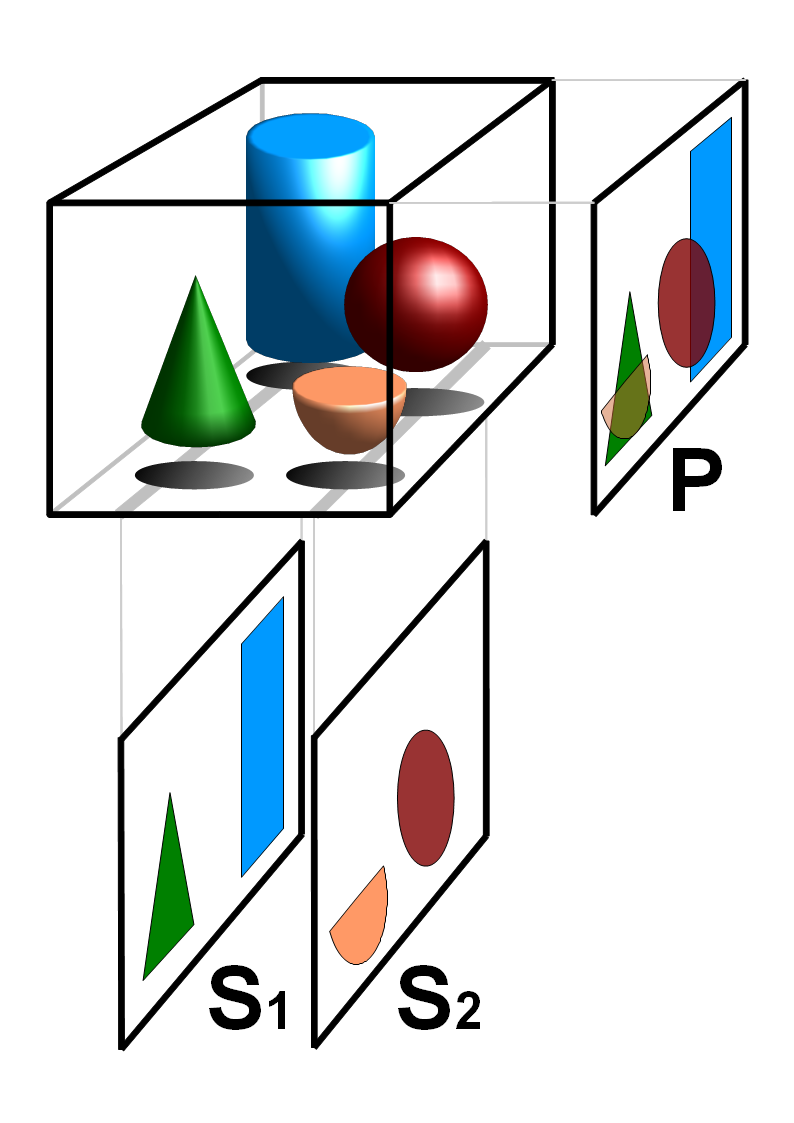
Inverse problems and tomography

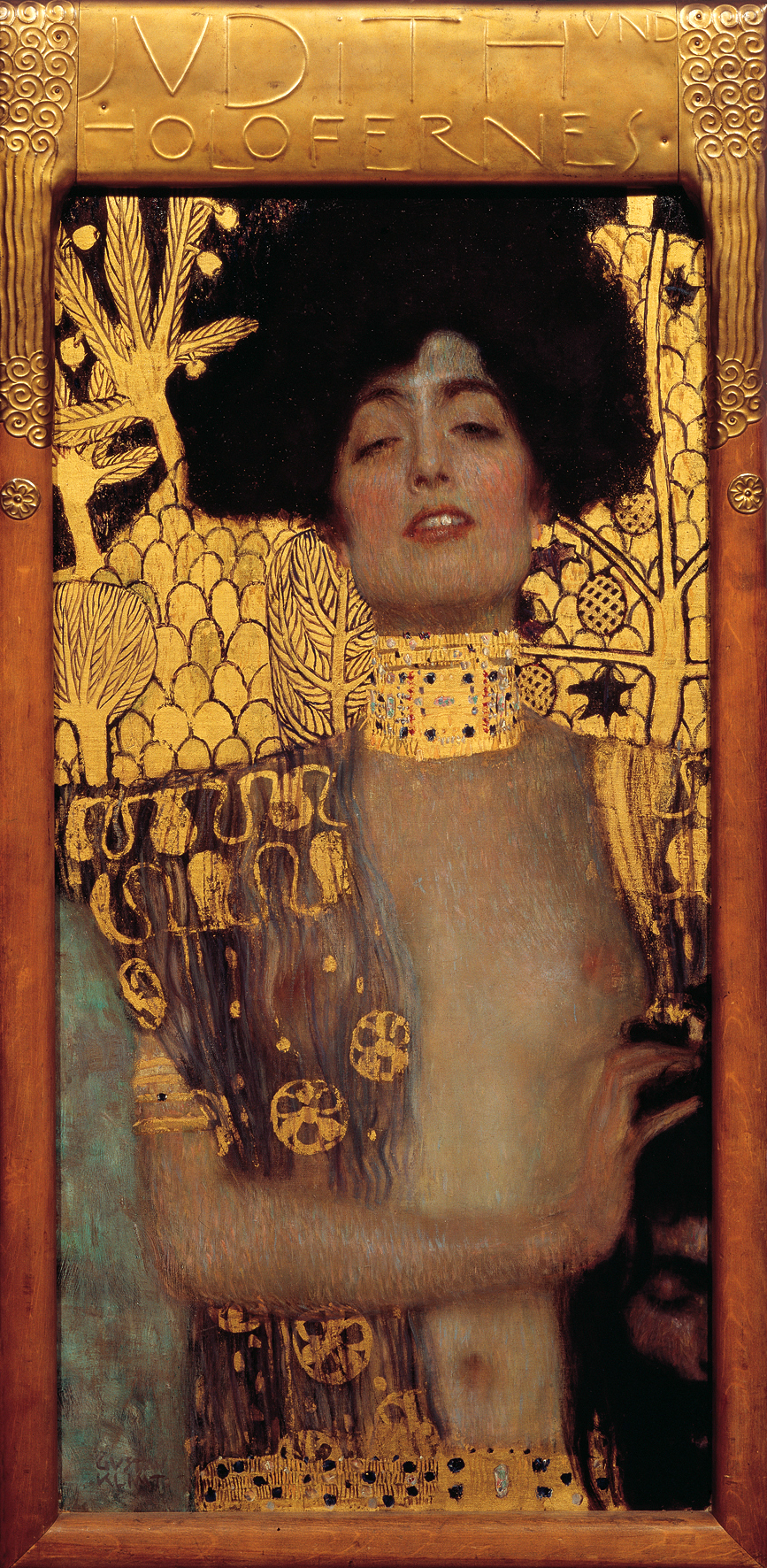
eFacsimile

At the core of his laboratory's current research is mathematical signal processing, that is, the set of tools and algorithms from applied harmonic analysis that are central to signal processing. These include representations for signals (Fourier, wavelets, frames), sampling theory, and sparse representations.

A main application of signal processing is in communications and sensor networks. In addition to important classic topics like channel estimation and equalization, multiuser systems like sensor networks are of great interest. This leads to distributed compression, sampling, and modeling of physical phenomena.

The area of audio processing and digital acoustics deals with multi-channel acquisition, processing and rendering of audio signals. This includes questions of sound field sampling, synthesis and perception.

Inverse problems and tomography are key signal processing tasks where state of the art techniques have high potential impact. In particular, the project on ultrasound tomography intends to solve a long-standing quest for a safe and affordable breast cancer screening method.

In the area of image/video processing and applications, his research has on-going projects in image acquisition, image representations, and super-resolution imaging. Applications include image annotation and augmented reality for mobile devices.

The eFacsimile research project, sponsored by Google, is focused on the research and development of a new acquisition, representation and rendering paradigm for the high-quality reproduction of artwork.

The research of Martin Vetterli has led to about 150 journal papers and resulted also in about two dozen patents that led to technology transfers to high-tech companies and the creation of several start-ups.

Martin Vetterli is a co-author of the book Wavelets and Subband Coding (Prentice-Hall, 1995). In 2008, Vetterli authored with Paolo Prandoni a free textbook Signal Processing for Communications.

In 2014, another book with the title Foundations of Signal Processing (coauthored by Jelena Kovačević and Vivek Goyal) was also published freely accessible.

=== Presidency of the EPFL ===
On 1 January 2017, Martin Vetterli became the EPFL's fifth president. The priorities of his direction team include open science, computational thinking and sustainability. Starting 1 January 2025, the Swiss Federal Council appointed Anna Fontcuberta i Morral as the sixth President of EPFL for a 4-year term, succeeding Martin Vetterli. She is the first woman to hold the position.

== Awards and honours ==
- 2017 IEEE Jack S. Kilby Signal Processing Medal
- Best paper award from EURASIP Journal on Advances in Signal Processing (1984)
- Best paper award from IEEE Signal Processing Society (1991, 1996 and 2006)
- Fellow of the IEEE "for contributions to the theory and practice of subband coding and wavelets" (1995)
- National Latsis Prize (1996)
- SPIE Presidential award (1999)
- IEEE Signal Processing Technical Achievement Award (2001)
- Fellow of the Association for Computing Machinery (2009)
- Fellow of EURASIP
- IEEE Signal Processing Society Award (2010)
- Former member of the Swiss Science and Innovation Council (2000-2004)
- President of the National Research Council of the Swiss National Science Foundation
- International Member of the US National Academy of Engineering.

== Bibliography ==
- Martin Vetterli and Jelena Kovacevic (1995). Wavelets and Subband Coding. Prentice Hall PTR. ISBN 0130970808.
- Paolo Prandoni and Martin Vetterli (2008). Signal Processing for Communications. Presses polytechniques et universitaires romandes. ISBN 9782940222209.
- Martin Vetterli, Jelena Kovacevic and Vivek Goyal (2014). Foundations of Signal Processing. Cambridge University Press. ISBN 9781107038608.
