= Chebucto Community Net =

Canadian FreeNet

Coordinates: 44.637155°N 63.593245°W

Chebucto Community Net logo

The Chebucto Community Net (CCN) is a Canadian FreeNet operating in Nova Scotia's Halifax Regional Municipality (HRM). It is registered as a non-profit society under Nova Scotia's Registry of Joint Stocks using the name Chebucto Community Net Society. The name "Chebucto" comes from the local l'nu word for Halifax Harbour meaning "big water".

Established in June 1994 in what was then the Dalhousie University Department of Mathematics, Statistics and Computing Science, then called the Chebucto Free Net, is now the oldest Internet Service Provider operating in the province of Nova Scotia and one of the first community nets in Canada. The Chebucto Suite or CSuite operating environment for free-nets was developed by Chebucto Community Net and used by many Canadian free-nets.

Chebucto Community Net was also originally known as the Metro Community Access Network Society. CCN is a registered Canadian charity, and is a volunteer organization with representatives from across the municipality. CCN provides people in the HRM with Internet "tools and services for sharing the broadest range of information, experience, ideas, and wisdom."

Originally offering only a text-based terminal access to Internet and email, Chebucto Community Net has offered full Point-to-Point Protocol Internet access since 1998. CCN provides Internet services for individuals and non-profit groups, including dial-up, web hosting, email and mailing lists.

In June 2013, Chebucto Community Net's Manors Project began offering Chebucto Wireless Wi-Fi access to Joseph Howe Manor and H.P. MacKeen Manor, public-owned low-income seniors housing. This is the first non-profit public-run highspeed home Internet access in Atlantic Canada.

CCN continues to be affiliated with Dalhousie University in Halifax with its registered office located in the Chase Building, home of Dalhousie University's Department of Mathematics and Statistics.

CCN is a member of ACORN-NS, the Atlantic Canada Organization of Research Networks and the Halifax Regional Community Access Program.

CCN has also given a presentation for the Canadian Radio-television and Telecommunications Commission, encouraging the government to give nonprofits more control over internet access.

== See also ==
- Community network
- Community informatics
- National Capital FreeNet
- Vancouver Community Network
- Free-Net
- ACORN-NS
- CANARIE
