= Freenet (disambiguation) =

Freenet, now called Hyphanet , is a pioneering anonymous peer-to-peer distributed data store.

Freenet may also refer to:

- Freenet (Central Asia), certain national internet structures in Central Asia
- Free-Net, a text-based community computer network which offers limited Internet services, at little or no cost, is also known as a "free-net"
- Wireless community network, the term "freenet" is commonly used to refer to "free networks".
- Freenet AG, a German telecommunication company
- National Capital FreeNet, a community organization internet service provider in Ottawa
- Freenet (ISP) New Zealand's first free internet service provider
- Freenet (radio), a Personal Mobile Radio system in Germany
