= Vice Chief of the Naval Staff =

Vice Chief of the Naval Staff (VCNS) may refer to:

- Vice Chief of the Naval Staff (India)
- Vice Chief of the Naval Staff (Pakistan)
- Vice Chief of the Naval Staff (United Kingdom)

== See also ==
- VCN (disambiguation)
