= Vancouver Community Network =

Non-profit based in Vancouver, British Columbia

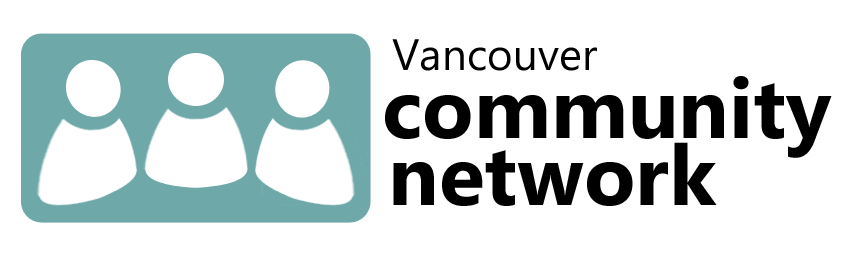
- 49°16′56.59″N 123°6′26.87″W
- Formation: May 21, 1993; 33 years ago
- Founder: Brian Campbell
- Founded at: Vancouver, British Columbia, Canada
- Type: Nonprofit organization
- Location: Woodward's Heritage Building, Suite 280-111, West Hastings, Vancouver, BC
- Services: Internet access Technical support Web hosting service
- Key people: Tracey Axelsson, Executive Director
- Website: www2.vcn.bc.ca

Vancouver Community Network (VCN) is a community-owned provider of free internet access, technical support, and web hosting services to individuals and nonprofit organizations in Vancouver, British Columbia.

It developed StreetMessenger, a communication service for the homeless.

== History ==
The organization was founded as Vancouver FreeNet by Brian Campbell and others.

Revenue Canada initially rejected VCN's application status as a charitable organization, which would have allowed it to receive tax-deductible contributions. VCN appealed this decision, and in 1997, the Federal Court of Appeal ruled that providing free internet service was a charitable tax purpose.

== See also ==
- Chebucto Community Network
- Free-Net
- Wireless community network
- Community informatics
- National Capital Freenet
