= TeleCommunities Canada =

Canadian association of community internet providers

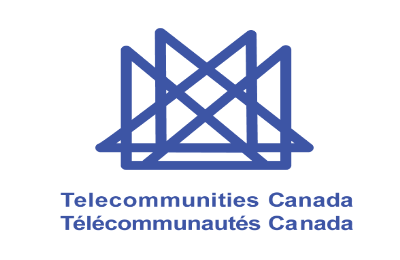
- Formation: 1994
- Type: Nonprofit
- Location: Ottawa, Ontario, Canada
- Official language: English and French
- President: Marita Moll
- Vice President: Clarice Leader
- Treasurer: Chris Cope
- Funding: donations
- Website: tc.ca

TeleCommunities Canada (TC) (French: TéléCommunautés Canada), is the national association that represents the Canadian community networking movement within Canada and internationally.

The organization was formed at a meeting on Ottawa, Ontario in the summer of 1994 and was formally incorporated as a nonprofit corporation in May 1995.

== Organization ==
TC has nine elected volunteer board members, four advisors and a webmaster. As of 2024 the president was Marita Moll, vice president was Clarice Leader, secretary Tracy Axelson and the treasurer Chris Cope. Four board meetings are normally held each year.

The organization has no permanent offices of its own and uses National Capital FreeNet's office in Ottawa as its mailing address.

Funding is provided though donations, grants, conference revenues and some funding from Industry Canada that was provided for three annual community networking conferences.

== History ==
The concept of a national organization was proposed by Garth Graham on 19 August 1993, in a paper entitled, Cyberbia: Structural Alternatives For A Canadian Network Of Networked Communities. Graham proposed the name "Cyberbia" for the new organization.

TC was formed a year later, in August 1994 at the second Community Networking Conference in Ottawa, at the height of the popularity of the FreeNets in Canada, with 29 FreeNets in existence or being formed. By 6 May 1995 there were 26 community networks operating and another 67 were being organized.

TC was conceived as an organization to represent the non-profit community networks of various kinds that had sprung up in that early period of the internet. André Laurendeau from the Montreal FreeNet, became the first president and David Sutherland, the founder of National Capital FreeNet, served on TC's board. The organization quickly filled the role of reviewing and consulting on the internet policies of the Canadian federal government, while passing on best practices to its member local providers.

TC was one of the founding organizations of the Global Community Network Partnership (GCNP). GCNP is an informal international group that runs international internet conferences. GCNP was recognized by the World Summit on the Information Society's (WSIS) Civil Society Secretariat. TC formally registered with WSIS and has participated in their processes. TC remains a participant in the expanded WSIS+20.

The Canadian federal government department responsible for internet policy, Industry Canada, launched its Community Access Program (CAP) in 1995 and TC was invited to be on its national advisory council. The CAP was intended as a community economic development initiative to promote local internet access and it survived until 2009 when the commercial market for internet service had supplanted it from a policy perspective.

Many programs developed by local community providers were expanded and spread to other parts of the country under TC's umbrella. These included National Capital FreeNet's SchoolNet and what became the CAP. The Chebucto Community Network in Halifax developed the "Chebucto Suite" of software programs for community networks that is still being used today.

In 1995 TC conducted a study of information and communications technology (ICT) for the Office of Learning Technologies of the federal government's Human Resources Development Canada (HRDC). The study looked at the use of community networks in assisting people looking to upgrade work skills and find employment.

TC also participated in the 1995 Canadian Radio-television and Telecommunications Commission (CRTC) hearings on information highway convergence and the 1998 hearings on new media. The organization was also involved in all the phases of the Information Highway Advisory Council and the Blue Ribbon Panel on Smart Communities.

The organization developed a number of tools to help the community networks, including open source web portal software, webmail software, streaming video services and a national community networking database.

The organization has also participated in the Canadian Research Alliance for Community Innovation and Networking's (CRACIN) 2003-2005 study of federal government programs used to promote public access and development of internet services. This three-year study was supported by a C$1M grant from the Social Sciences and Humanities Research Council and involved two TC board members.

In 2005 TC participated in the Canadian federal government's national review of its telecommunications policy.

From 13–15 May 2005 TC's delegation attended Paving the Road to Tunis - WSIS II: Canada's Civil Society Views on the Geneva Plan of Action and the Prospects for Phase II, a conference organized by the Canadian Commission for UNESCO, held in Winnipeg. TC presented a paper Beyond the Information Society, arguing in favour of a "Learning Society", where communities would have access to all the resources they need to improve conditions, including financial support for community-based initiatives.

TC was one of the founding members of the Internet Corporation for Assigned Names and Numbers (ICANN) North American Regional At-Large Organization and remains a member in the ICANN At-Large Constituency which represents end users at the international level. TC board members have also served on the board of the Canadian Internet Registration Association (CIRA).
