= VCN =

VCN may refer to:

- The ventral cochlear nucleus
- Acrylonitrile, also called vinyl cyanide
- Vancouver Community Network
- Video Core Next – brand for some ASIC related to video compression and decompression by AMD
- Virtual card number
