= Community network =

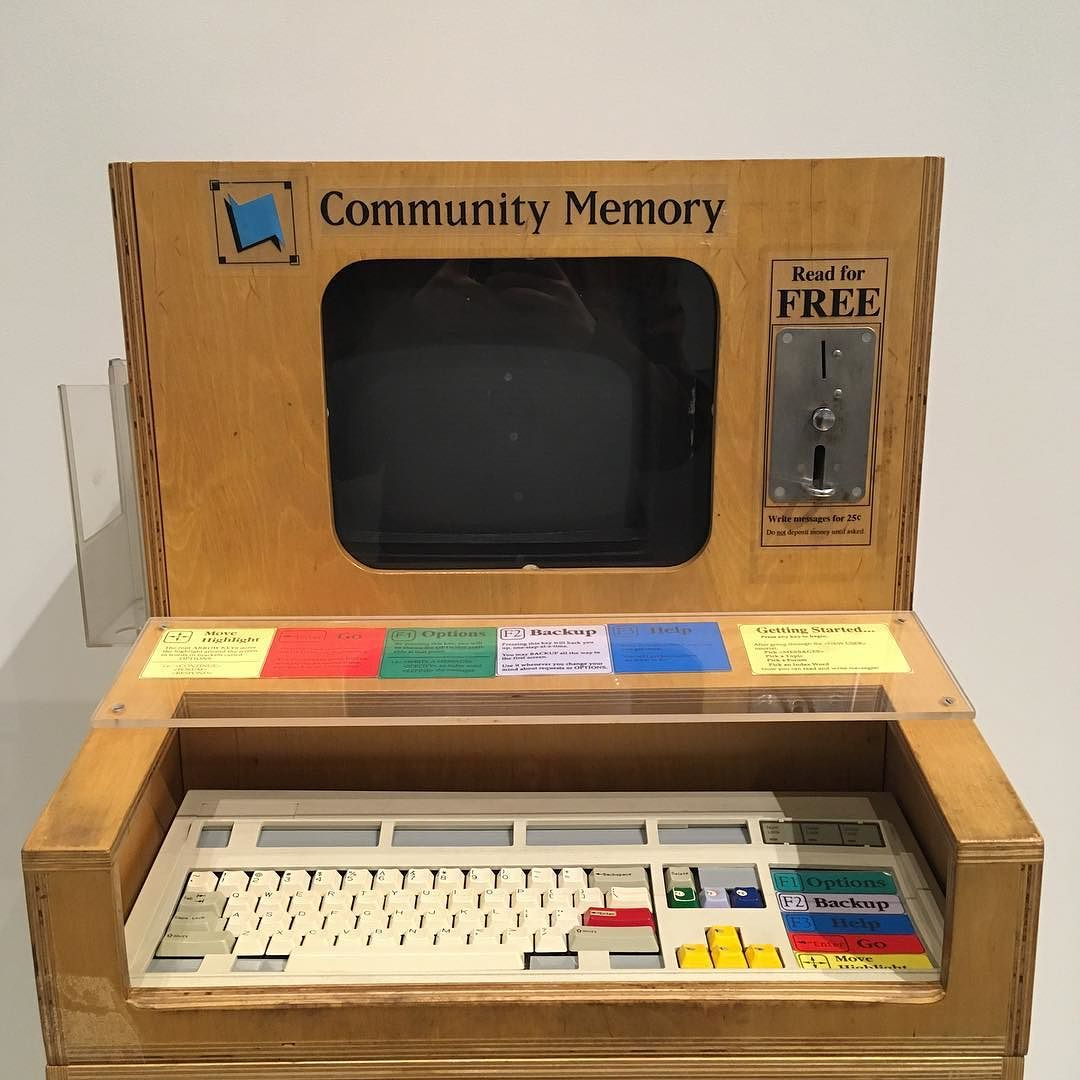
A terminal for Community Memory, an early community network in the mid-1970s

A community network is a computer-based system that is intended to help support (usually geographical) communities by supporting, augmenting, and extending already existing social networks, by using networking technologies by, and for, a community.

Free-nets and civic networks indicate roughly the same range of online projects and services, usually focused on bulletin board systems and online information, but sometimes also providing a means of network access directly to the Internet or other networks; whereas community technology centers (CTCs) and telecentres generally indicate a physical facility to compensate for lack of access to information and communication technologies (ICTs).

== Function ==
Community networks often provide web space, e-mail, and other services for free, without advertising. VillageSoup launched a distinct form of community networking in 1997. This form uses display ads and informational postings from fee-paying business and organization members to generate revenue critical to the support of professional journalists producing news for the community.

Community network organizations often engage in training and other services and sometimes are involved in policy work. The Seattle Community Network is a prominent example.

When one looks at the entries of community network directories or the papers and Web sites whose titles and names include "community network" or "community networking", it is noticeable that a variety of practices exist. This diversity can be seen in the types of information and services offered, who operates the network, and the area covered.

The most extensive array of information services in a community network includes news from professional and amateur reporters, news and information from businesses and organizations; community events listings; weather forecasts; listings of governmental offices, businesses and organizations; and galleries of images of the place. Services include requesting alerts and RSS feeds; making reservations; searching for goods and services; purchasing images and auction items; and posting personal and commercial advertisements. A printed periodic publication is sometimes a service of the community network.

Some community networks limit themselves to functions such as facilitating communication among non-profit organizations.

Internet-based volunteer networks of blogs and groups have been formed in the internet social-networking field as well. The Alabama Charity Network, for example, provided another place for people to connect to fundraisers and charity information using internet-based social networking.

The entities in charge of planning and operating the community networks may be government offices, chambers of commerce, public libraries, non-profit organizations, for-profit entities or volunteer groups.

The primary goals of a community network may include providing a sustainable, trusted platform for an urban neighborhood, suburban village or exurban town or region to enhance a vital community and functioning democracy; closing of the digital divide across socio-economic lines; offering easier access to already existing information and services; promotion of local economic development and employment; strengthening of local identity; and/or revitalization, promotion, and/or maintenance of local communal ties.

The area identified with a community network could be a town, city, county, metropolitan neighborhood, state, and occasionally a region.

== Examples ==
Though Community Memory existed in Berkeley, California in the 1970s and private bulletin board systems that welcomed the general public flourished during the late 1970s through the early 1990s, "community networking" as an intentional goal became popular in the late 1980s and early 1990s.

Among the early systems were Big Sky Telegraph (Montana, USA) in 1988; Cleveland Free-Net (Ohio, USA) in 1986 and its similar free-nets in following years; the Public Electronic Network (PEN) in Santa Monica, California (USA) in 1989; and De Digital Stad (DDS) (nl) in Amsterdam (The Netherlands) in 1994.

Redbricks Intranet Collective (RIC) is a community network started in Manchester, UK in 1998.

VillageSoup created the first community network based on a business model suggested in the 1997 book Net Gain: Expanding Markets Through Virtual Communities, authored by John Hagel III and Arthur G. Armstrong, two McKinsey & Company, Inc. consultants.

== See also ==
- Community informatics
- Wireless community network
