= Freenet (radio) =

Freenet is a personal mobile radio network in Germany. It was originally introduced in 1996 as a product name of Motorola and uses part of the frequency spectrum of the former B-Netz carphone network.

== History ==
The original frequency allocation for Freenet encompassed three channels, each with a 12.5 kHz spacing. In January 2007, three additional channels were added, bringing the total up to six.

The ordinance only permits handheld transceivers which must not permit an effective radiated power (ERP) of 1 W.

Originally, the Freenet frequencies were allocated until the end of 2005. The Federal Network Agency has extended this allocation until 31 January 2025.

== Specification and radios ==
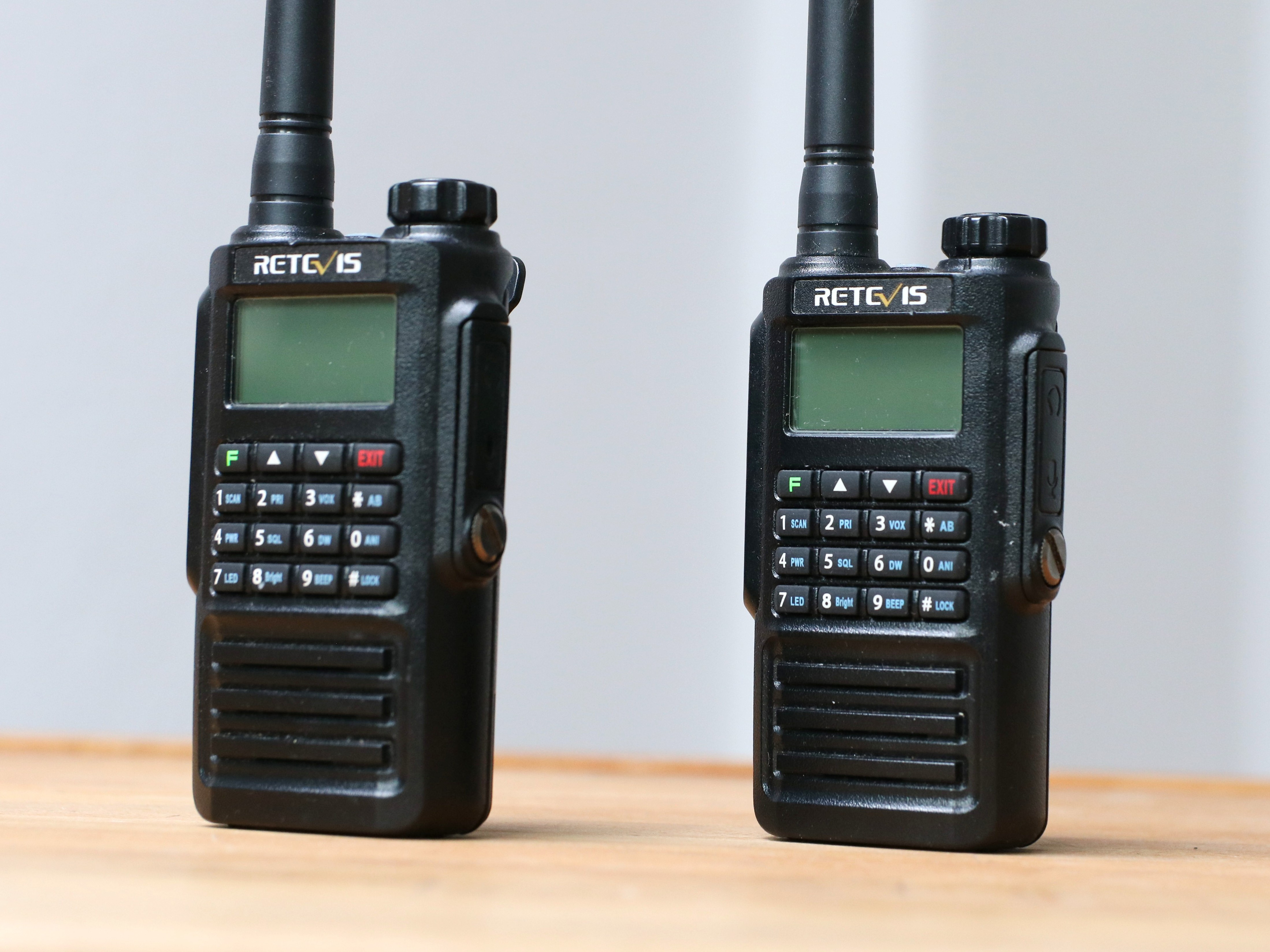
Amateur Radio handhelds like the Retevis RT87 in low-Power mode are used for Freenet Communication

With the maximum permitted ERP of 1W, a range of 3 km (1.9 mi) can be assumed. Due to the lower frequencies in the VHF band, signal attenuation from objects, such as houses and trees, is not as high as in the UHF band used by SRD and PMR446 radios.

Only specially certified and licensed transceivers may be used; the manufacturer must provide a declaration of conformity as well as a concise manual in German and a CE mark. The user is not permitted to modify the device. The Federal Network Agency has laid out strict parameters for modulation, bandwidth and channel spacing in its ordinance.

To be observed is, that relatively high prices for Freenet devices have kept away domestic users from the service. All radios, which can transmit optional on other frequencies or / and switchable power are prohibited by the Federal Network Agency. So the number of legal available devices is mutch smaller than in UHF PMR. Only a small number of companies produce radio for the Freenet-service, due to the small market. Kenwood, Motorola, Retevis and a German re-seller, selling modified Wouxun radios under the brand "Team Tecom" are the only companies for Freenet devices. Often amateur radios handhelds in low-Power mode are used for Freenet communication.

== Channel table ==
Freenet channels are within the 2 meter band business radio allocations.

=== FM-analog mode ===
Channel	Frequency
1	149.0250 MHz
2	149.0375 MHz
3	149.0500 MHz
4	149.0875 MHz
5	149.1000 MHz
6	149.1125 MHz

=== Digital modes ===
Canal (TDMA)	Middelfrequency in MHz	Chanelwide in kHz
1	149,0250	12,5
2	149,0375	12,5
3	149,0500	12,5
4	149,0875	12,5
5	149,1000	12,5
6	149,1125	12,5

Kanal (FDMA)	Middelfrequency in MHz	Chanelwith in kHz
1	149,021875	6,25
2	149,028125	6,25
3	149,034375	6,25
4	149,040625	6,25
5	149,046875	6,25
6	149,053125	6,25
7	149,084375	6,25
8	149,090625	6,25
9	149,096875	6,25
10	149,103125	6,25
11	149,109375	6,25
12	149,115625	6,25

== Freenet abroad ==
Freenet is a national radio allocation that is used in Germany only. Foreign regulatory bodies usually do not permit use of Freenet devices since the frequencies are often already allocated for different radio services. Instead, PMR446 has been harmonised on a European level. Due to possible interference with Swiss military networks, it is not permitted to use the Freenet frequencies in the Black Forest and on the Swabian Alb at elevations of 600 metres (2,000 ft) or above.
