= Free-net =

Type of community-based online service

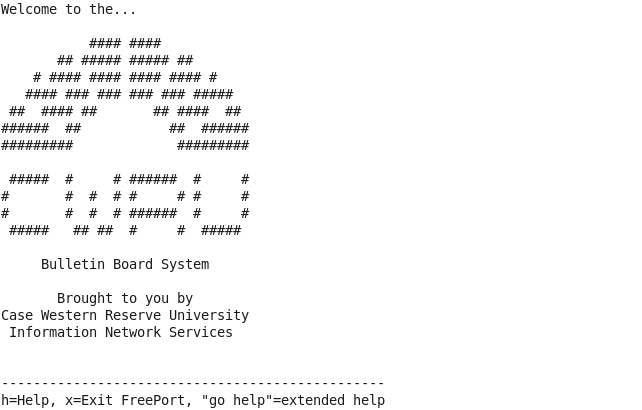
Welcome banner for a Free-Net bulletin board system, 1994

A free-net was originally a computer system or network that provided public access to digital resources and community information, including personal communications, through modem dialup via the public switched telephone network. The concept originated in the health sciences to provide online help for medical patients. With the development of the Internet free-net systems became the first to offer limited Internet access to the general public to support the non-profit community work. The Cleveland Free-Net (cleveland.freenet.edu), founded in 1986, was the pioneering community network of this kind in the world.

Any person with a personal computer, or through access from public terminal in libraries, could register for accounts on a free-net, and was assigned an email address. Other services often included Usenet newsgroups, chat rooms, IRC, telnet, and archives of community information, delivered either with text-based Gopher software or later the World-Wide Web.

The word mark Free-Net was a registered trademark of the National Public Telecomputing Network (NPTN), founded in 1989 by Tom Grundner at Case Western Reserve University. NPTN was a non-profit organization dedicated to establishing and developing, free, public access, digital information and communication services for the general public. It closed operations in 1996, filing for Chapter 7 bankruptcy. However, prior use of the term created some conflicts. NPTN distributed the software package FreePort, developed at Case Western Reserve, that was used and licensed by many of the free-net sites.

The Internet domain name freenet.org was first registered by the Greater Detroit Free-Net (detroit.freenet.org), a non-profit community system in Detroit, MI, and a member of the NPTN. The Greater Detroit Free-Net provided other subdomains to several free-net systems during its operation from 1993 to approximately 2001.

Unlike commercial Internet service providers, free-nets originally provided direct terminal-based dialup, instead of other networked connections, such as Point-to-Point Protocol (PPP). The development of Internet access with cheaper and faster connections, and the advent of the World-Wide Web made the original free-net community concept obsolete.

A number of free-nets, including the original Cleveland Free-Net, have shut down or changed their focus. Free-nets have always been locally governed, so interpretation of their mission to remove barriers to access and provide a forum for community information, as well as services offered, can vary widely. As text-based Internet became less popular, some of the original free-nets have made available PPP dialup and more recently DSL services, as a revenue generating mechanism, with some now transitioning into the community wireless movement.

Several free-net systems continue under new mission statements. Rochester Free-Net (Rochester, New York), for instance, focuses on hosting community service organizations (over 500 to date) as well as seminars about Internet use to the community at no charge. Austin FreeNet (Austin, Texas) now provides technology training and access to residents of the city, "fostering skills that enable people to succeed in a digital age."

== See also ==
- Bulletin board system
- Wireless community network
- Community informatics
- National Capital FreeNet
- Shell account
- Usenet
