= National Capital FreeNet =

Canadian non-profit Internet service provider

- Abbreviation: NCF
- Formation: September 1992
- Type: NGO
- Legal status: Non-profit association
- Purpose: Educational
- Headquarters: Suite 206 Richmond Square, 1305 Richmond Road, Ottawa, Ontario K2B 7Y4
- Location: Ottawa, Ontario
- Region served: Ottawa, Ontario; Gatineau, Québec
- Members: Individuals
- Official language: English & French
- President: Chris Cope
- Main organ: Board of Directors
- Staff: 13
- Website: www.ncf.ca

National Capital FreeNet (NCF) (French: Libertel de la Capitale Nationale), is a non-profit community organization Internet service provider, with the goal of linking people in Canada's capital of Ottawa, ensuring no Ottawa citizens would be excluded from Internet access.

Founded in September 1992 with the active participation of volunteers, Carleton University, and private industry (which donated communications equipment), NCF was one of the first free-nets set up worldwide and was patterned after the Cleveland Free-Net that had been established at Case Western Reserve University in 1984. Within a year of its establishment NCF had over 10,000 members.

NCF offers broadband (DSL) and dial-up service to people in the national capital region; in early 2012, over 4,000 members used its dial-up service.

The National Capital FreeNet is a free, computer-based information sharing network. It links the people and organizations of this region, provides useful information, and enables an open exchange of ideas with the world. Community involvement makes FreeNet an important and accessible meeting place, and prepares people for full participation in a rapidly changing communications environment."

== History ==
In many ways the history of NCF parallels that of the Internet itself. In the early 1990s NCF was one of the region's only Internet service providers and members flocked to it to take advantage of the new technology. Due to its volunteer and donation-based model the organization failed to keep up with the rapid technological changes that occurred in the 1995–2000 period and lost most of its membership to commercial ISPs as a result. Later it floundered trying to make ends meet and finally established itself in the niche market of providing services to disadvantaged segments of the community. NCF board member Jim Elder summarized NCF's early history: "NCF surfed the wave of Internet success in the first-half of the 1990s, but lost the wave in 1995 and then tread water." NCF regained some of its 'mojo' in the early 2000s, when funding from Industry Canada's SmartCapital program and several partners helped NCF modernize its back office system and web pages, bringing NCF firmly into the web era."

The early days of this free-net featured dial-up service and web access using the Lynx browser. Members typically used the system to access Usenet, telnet, e-mail and Gopher. As the web became popular many new Internet users became NCF members before they went to a PPP provider for graphic access to the web. As the web evolved NCF began offering dial up PPP access.

=== 1990s ===
==== 1991 ====
National Capital FreeNet was started at a luncheon held in October 1991. Jay Weston of the Carleton University Department of Mass Communications and George Frajkor of the School of Journalism and Television Programming invited Dave Sutherland, the director of the university's Computing and Communication Services Department, to have lunch and discuss the concept of establishing a free-net based on the concept of the Cleveland Free-Net.

A committee independent of the university was formed under Sutherland's leadership and started meeting weekly that same month to lay the groundwork for the free-net. A decision was made to make the endeavour community-based and not part of the university, an approach supported by the university president.

==== 1992 ====
In the summer of 1992, the free-net was activated as a pilot project, using university computer resources that were underutilized over the summer. With help from Industry Canada, Sun Microsystems was persuaded to donate a computer and Gandalf Technologies provided the first modems.

In September, the Ottawa Citizen carried a front-page article by Dominic Lacasse, describing the new pilot free-net project. The article included the dial-in phone number and, as a result, twenty people per day started signing up as members.

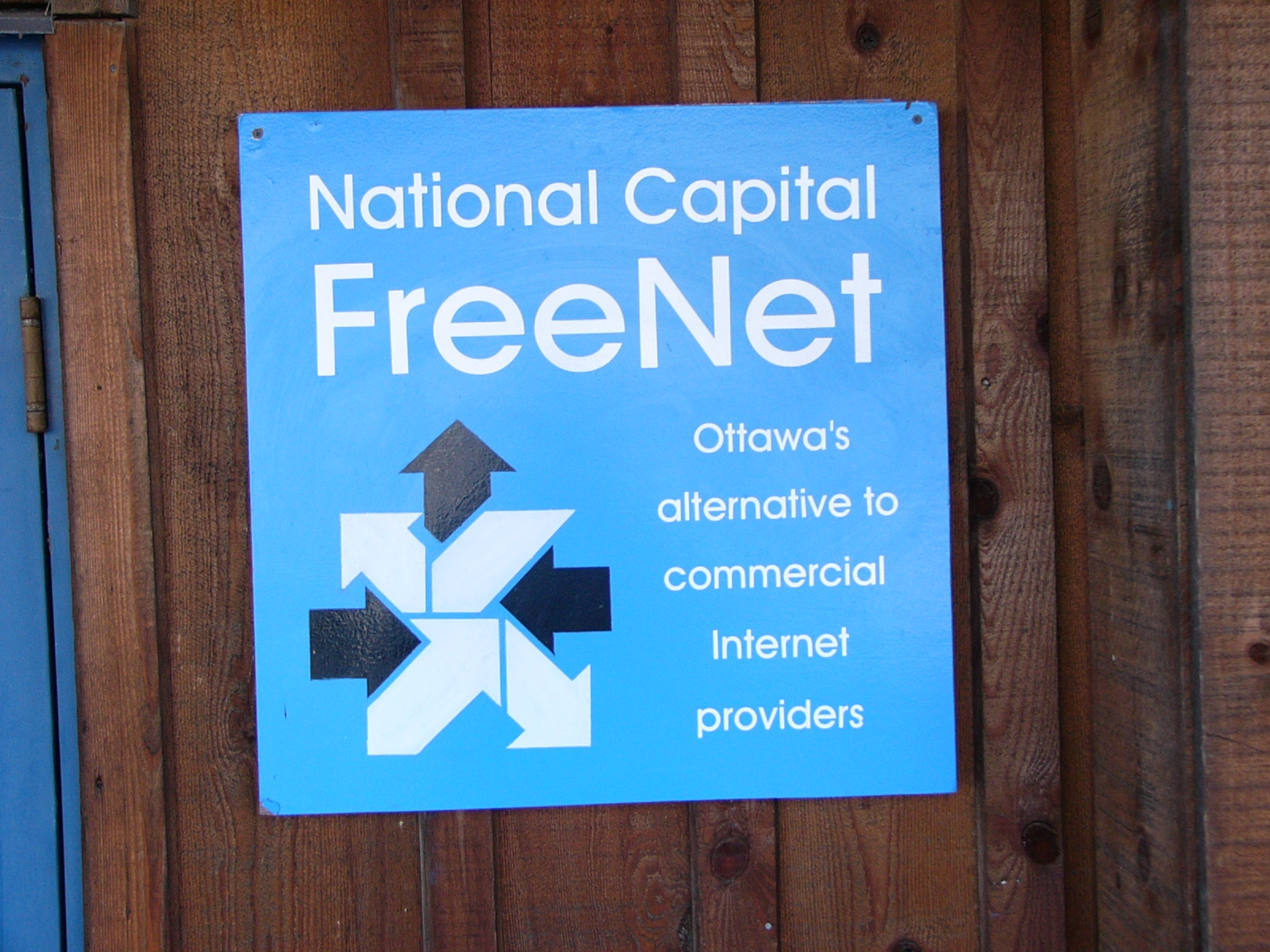
A sign at the NCF offices

The first NCF board meeting was held on 10 December 1992 with Sutherland as chairman. At that point the organization had a total of 4 dial-up lines, a custom logo designed by a graphic artist and Cdn$2120. The start-up funding was made up of Cdn$1000 from City of Ottawa Community Health, Cdn$1000 from the Carleton School Board, a private donation of Cdn$50, and Cdn$70 in cash on hand. The board indicated that the "correct spelling for FreeNet was confirmed at this time as " FreeNet ", with both the "F" and "N" capitalized."

==== 1993 ====
National Capital FreeNet had its official public launch on 1 February 1993.

In April 1993, Julie Chahal, head of the NCF's Public Access Committee presented a public access policy that was accepted by the board. This policy set free public access as a priority for the organization:

Public access terminals are a key element to meeting the National Capital FreeNet's objective to meet the present information needs of the people and public agencies in the region, and to prepare the community for full and broadly based participation in rapidly changing communication environments. They ensure that the Freenet is available to anyone interested, including those who may not own a home computer with a modem. - Julie Chahal

By April 1993, NCF had reached the limit of their first server in offering 58 dial-up phone lines and started upgrading to faster 14.4 kbps modems.

In the summer of 1993, the organization's application for charitable status was turned down by Revenue Canada, as was the application of another early freenet in Victoria, BC. NCF spent much of the year in fundraising activities to meet its mandate in the face of rapidly rising demands for service and the need to purchase new hardware on an ongoing basis. The organization hired its first Office Manager, Kyla Huckerby and committed to hiring a System Administrator as well.

Late in the year Ian Allen was hired as NCF's first System Manager, reporting to the board. By the end of the year, NCF had over 11,000 members.

==== 1994 ====
The association took delivery of its first Sun Microsystems SPARCstation computer and a new terminal server in April. By the end of the first quarter, NCF had 19,000 members.

The success of the free public terminals at the Ottawa Library was identified as problematic in a survey of users at that facility. The survey showed that some users were dominating the computers and this made it hard for others to access them. NCF dealt with this through a technological solution: limiting sign-in time on the public computers to one hour and to one log-in per day.

1994 also saw NCF make French language access a priority, forming a committee to make recommendations on ensuring that Francophone users in the nation's capital had equal access to NCF and registering the name Libertel as the French equivalent to FreeNet. By the end of June 1994 NCF had 97 dial-up phone lines and was expanding to a total of 120.

By the end of 1994, NCF had published an Internet Survival Guide aimed at both members and at the general public. The publication was free to members on the Internet and sold on paper to non-members. NCF activities had attracted the notice of CBC-TV who completed a news program on the association. Telephone help services were provided at the NCF offices by unpaid volunteers, a practice that continues today. NCF finished the year with 160 dial-up phone lines in operation.

One of the early supporters of the NCF community Internet project was Dr. José Luis Pardos, the Spanish Ambassador to Canada who brought the Embassy of Spain online using NCF.

==== 1995 ====
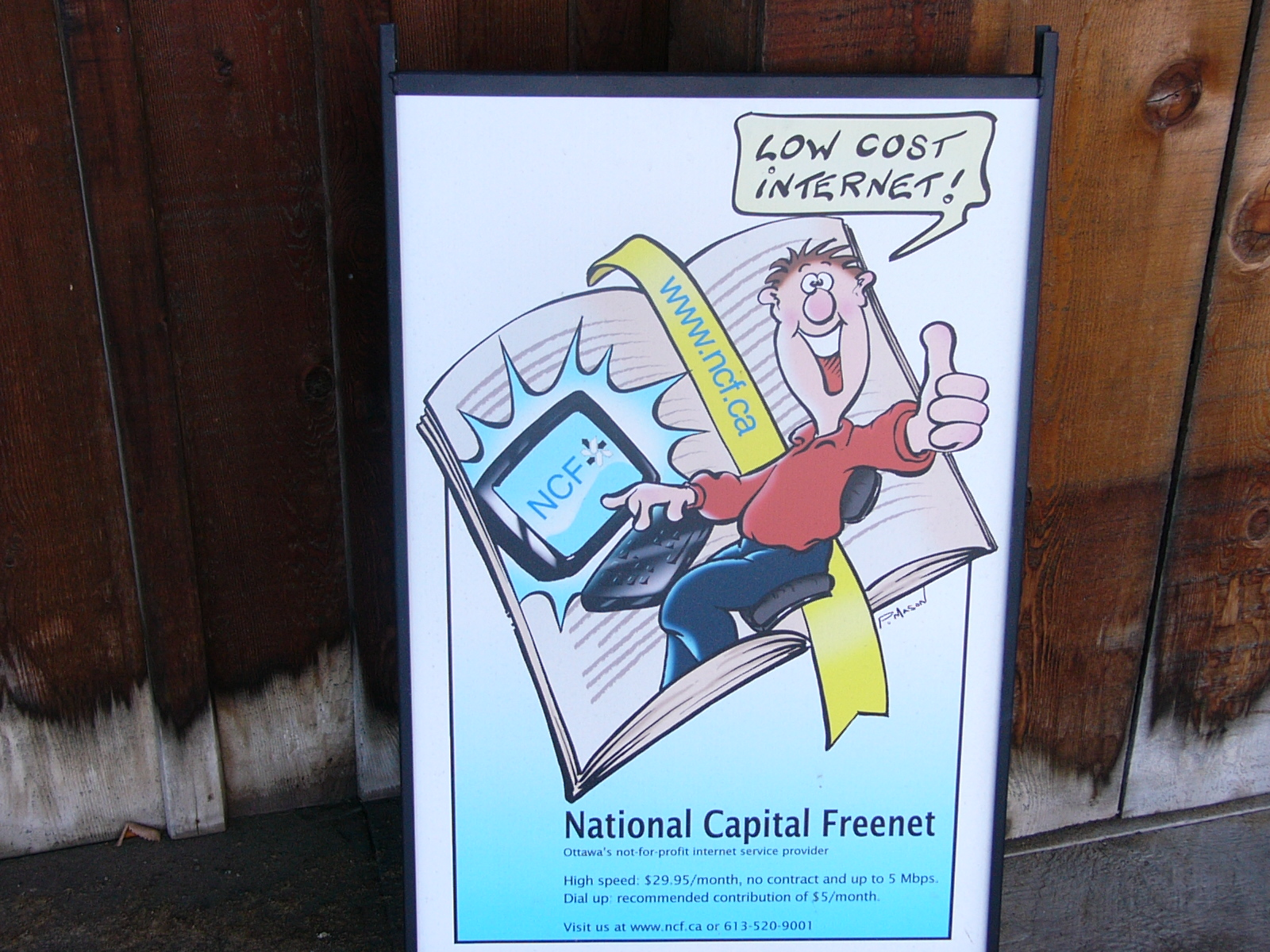
An NCF sign emphasizing the low cost focus of the organization

Lisa Donnelly became the organization's first executive director.

At the start of the year members were limited to two hours Internet usage per day with a one-hour time limit per log-in.

In an attempt to raise funds, NCF published a paper cookbook under the title From the Kitchens of the National Capital FreeNet. The project was headed by NCG member Andre Ouellette and came off the presses in May.

In June 1995, the organization adopted a Statement of Values that was based on free and equal access and specifically that there would be no charges for membership or Internet use, that the same services be available to all people of the region, unfettered communication and respect for the rights of others. The organization continued to fund its operations primarily from sponsorships, government grants, and donations.

By June 1995, NCF had 43,515 registered users and was taking action to make use of the then new World Wide Web through introduction of the Lynx text browser, among other preparations.

The organization had struggled with the need for and the drafting of an Acceptable Use Policy (AUP) since its inception. In September 1995, it finally adopted one. The AUP made individuals, and not NCF, responsible for their content posted on newsgroups and on the web, banned spamming, and provided guidance on offensive material and on personal attacks. On offensive material it stated:

NCF has something to offend everyone. It isn't IF something will offend you but HOW SOON you find something offensive. You always have the choice not to read anything you find offensive. NCF believes strongly in Intellectual Freedom. But this freedom requires that everyone learn to be tolerant. Generally the best way to handle offensive material is to ignore it. Commenting on the post may be giving the authors the attention they are seeking.

By the end of the year, it was becoming obvious that use of the World Wide Web was where the future lay and not in newsgroups and that the organization was at risk of being left behind and "of becoming a ghetto for the information-poor instead of helping all members of our community participate equally and fully in future information networks." This challenged the organization to provide ever newer hardware and software while maintaining free community access. These challenges lead to a debate as to whether NCF should be an up-to-date Internet service provider for the whole community in competition with the new commercial Internet providers, or focus on ensuring that the "novice, computer illiterate, and less-well-off segments" have Internet access.

==== 1996 ====
In January 1996 NCF began experimenting with using Solaris to run the news servers, as the organization began the transition from the NCF-developed text-based FreePort-based system to the World Wide Web.

The organization also formally adopted a Freedom of Expression Policy that acknowledged the Fundamental Freedoms of the Canadian Charter of Rights and Freedoms, the legal limitations on free speech in Canada, and that individuals were responsible for their posted material and not NCF. The policy stated that "however, NCF will cooperate with Canadian legal authorities to identify the person responsible for questionable material. NCF will only remove illegal material when directed to by Canadian legal authorities."

Hardware was upgraded in 1996 with the addition of two computers: a Sparc-10 and a Sparc-20. The transitions were complicated by the fact that the new computers ran Solaris, which did not support the existing FreePort, but were necessary to make the transition to the World Wide Web.

The organization had been using a set of rooms at Carleton University since its inception, but the addition of ever more equipment and of four staff members put pressure on NCF to find new accommodations. The organization considered offers of space at the university, public libraries, and high schools. It became clear that a move would have to happen in the future but, additional space was temporarily found at the university.

The middle of 1996 saw NCF facing a cash flow shortage. The organization had budgeted on the basis of past levels of donations from individuals and from corporate sponsorships and was in a period where new hardware was required while donations dropped off precipitously. In response, the board considered whether to cease expansion plans or move to a new funding model. They considered all options, including voluntary contributions, corporate sponsorships, government or foundation sponsorship, advertising, selling products, and membership fees. The last option was noted "Some other Freenets do charge a small membership fee. To date, the NCF Board has opposed having any fees. However, given a choice between continuing to operate with a fee or not continuing to operate, we may want to change our minds."

The organization decided initially to address funding with a multi-faceted approach that included approaching Mitel and the Royal Bank of Canada for cash sponsorships, approaching several partners for hardware donations, setting up a sponsor database, applying for municipal grants, recognizing donors on-line, updating on-line donation information, creating a webpage on activities, and auctioning off fifty-eight pieces of Microsoft software and five pieces of Corel Corporation software.

One aspect of its operations in 1996 that set NCF apart from commercial ISPs was its community outreach in that year. NCF not only established free-use computers in public places, such as libraries, but also made use of volunteers to teach classes, run drop-ins, and act as speakers to other organizations. NCF established a formal Electronic Resource and Access Centre staffed by volunteers at the main branch of the Ottawa Public Library.

Early in December, the three people who made up the full-time NCF staff moved into a new office, Dunton Tower at Carleton University. This was the first time that all had been located in the same place. Previously only the office manager had an actual office and the remaining staff and volunteers worked from home.

==== 1997 ====
In January, the NCF board voted to reduce the size of the board from 15 to 11 members. This move was suggested by Executive Director Lisa Donnelly with the aim of increasing board effectiveness while requiring less support from the executive director.

1997 marked the earliest indication of a spam problem on NCF newsgroups with some members being identified as having cross-posted messages on multiple groups and again over consecutive days. This resulted in a policy to warn and then suspend accounts involved for a minimum of 30 days.

The year also saw many of the earliest complaints by members about spam e-mail. The Executive Director responded saying:

Many NCF members, and users of the Internet around the world, are becoming frustrated by the increase in commercial e-mail over the last three months. This is a global phenomena and large ISPs and freenets alike are looking at solutions. If you post to newsgroups outside NCF or surf the web, you are a target for a variety of commercial mailers. The best thing to do is just hit the delete button when you get commercial mail. It is just like those annoying pizza flyers that keep arriving in our mail box and go straight to the recycle bin...Developing solutions will take a little time.

The organization's financial picture stabilized as members responded well to the requests for donations combined with some austerity measures, such as not replacing one staff person.

In May, Chris Cope was hired as the organization's second executive director, replacing Lisa Donnelly who had resigned after two years in the position.

In June, the incoming and outgoing executive directors collaborated on project planning for the near future and identified that the organization needed to focus on reliability and network upgrading, improving online service versatility and NCF's financial picture. Most of the reliability focus centered on the growing problem of spam e-mails. Incoming spam was addressed by blocking spamming domains, a strategy that did reduce the amount of spam being received.

NCF was able to count amongst its key partners, providing hardware, software and financial support: Fulcrum Technologies, Ingenia Corporation, Gandalf Canada, Dantek Computers, Ottawa Public Library, Oracle Corporation, Sun Microsystems, Microsoft, Hardware Canada Computing, Loran Technologies, Netscape and Carleton University.

In August, the organization reported that it had issued 63,785 validated user accounts of which 35,505 were in active use. NCF was providing access via 169 telephone dial-up modems, most of which were operating at 14.4 kbit/s. Towards the end of the year, data indicated that about 13-14% of Internet users in the Ottawa area were connecting through NCF.

==== 1998 ====
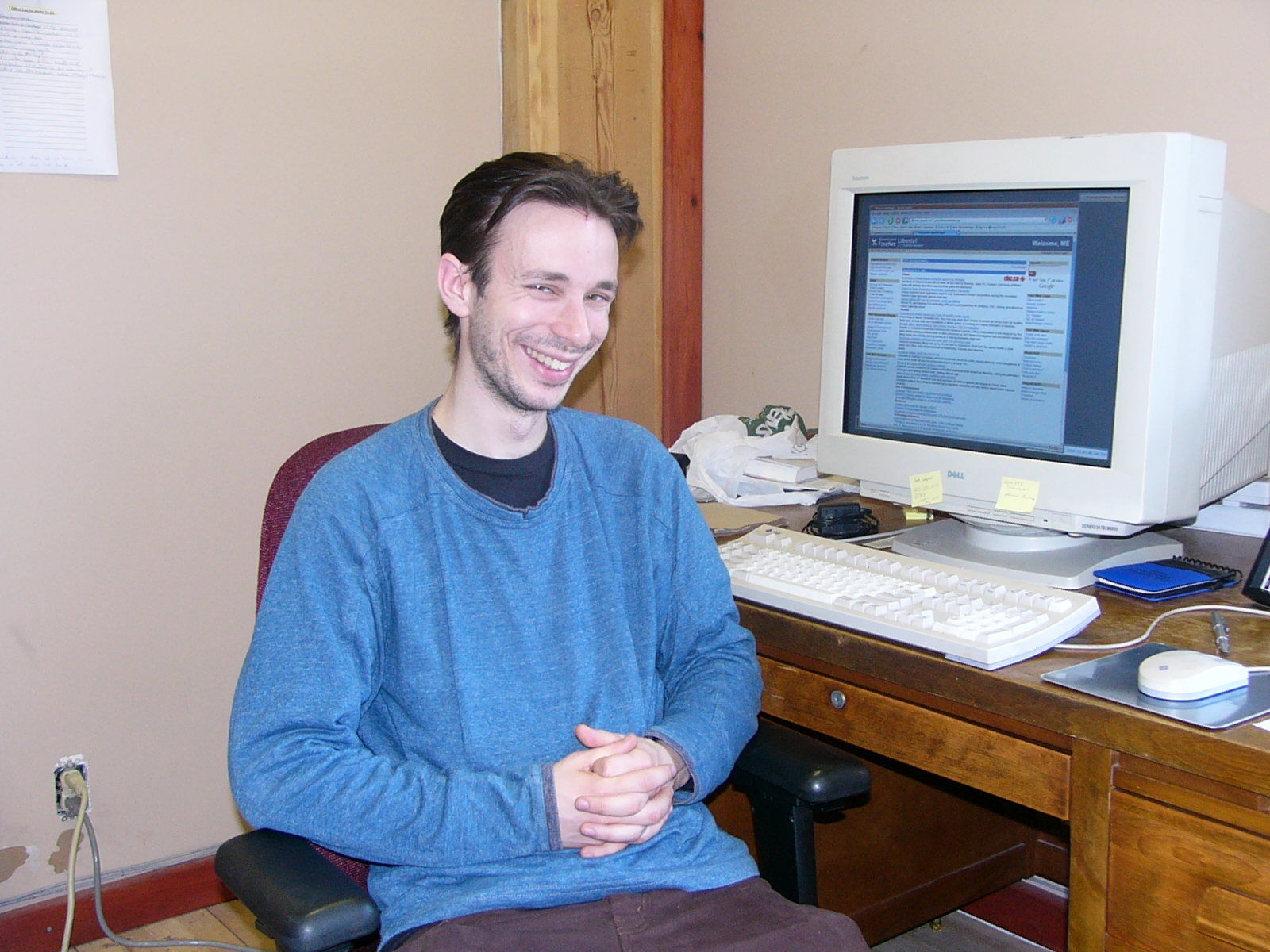
National Capital Freenet system administrator (1998-present) Andre Dalle

On 4 February 1998, NCF completed its Extended Access Project, adding 32 more dial-up PPP telephone lines at Mitel. The project resulted in a total of 201 dial-up lines and modems available for use.

By March 1998, NCF was running 13 computers, of various models, and a range of operating systems, including Solaris 2.5 and 2.6, SunOS 4.1.2 and 4.1.4, Linux 2.0 and 2.0.33, and Windows 95. The office administration was using a similar range of computers, including a Macintosh and various IBM machines.

March 25 saw a major hardware upgrade, as one server was changed to a twin hyperSparc 90 MHz computer donated by Hardware Canada Computing, which replaced a twin SuperSparc 50 MHz processor. The computer also had its operating system changed from SunOS 4.1.3-U1 to Solaris 2.6. The machine also received a new FastEthernet card connected to a 100 Mbit/s port. The result was described as a "dramatic performance increase". NCF continued to move away from older operating systems to Solaris, with web server experiments carried out on Apache 1.2.6 and Netscape Enterprise Server 3.5.1.

As part of the migration to using the World Wide Web, NCF fielded its first homepage in mid-1998, the result of a design competition amongst members.

Throughout 1998, the organization continued to suffer from declining membership and shrinking donations. Due to being turned down for a number of government grants, NCF was at this time relying almost exclusively on donations to cover expenses. As a result, the board considered cutting the number of modems and lines to save money.

Late in the year, NCF started installing new 28.8 kbit/s modems to upgrade the connection speeds available. The board decided not to cut modems, as it was felt that better service would attract more members and donations. Long-serving NCF system administrator Andre Dalle was hired on 9 November 1998.

In checking the server system, in November 1998, it was discovered that more than half the servers were not Y2K compliant, particularly the ones running SunOS 4.1.4. This required upgrades and patching to be ready for the roll-over to the 21st century.

==== 1999 ====
In March NCF had 14,517 active member accounts. As a volunteer community organization, NCF continued to be well supported by the IT industry with hardware and with software donations, often older used equipment as companies upgraded to newer hardware. For example, in March 1999, Hardware Canada Computing donated a Horizon UltraSparc III UNIX Workstation valued at more than Cdn$8,500. This new computer offered more capabilities than any other that the organization had at the time and was employed as a server to consolidate mail, webserver, and web-mail services. Other examples include Newbridge Networks donating two Sparc10 workstations, a 20-port Xyplex MX-1620 terminal server, and some GeoRim/Es 8-port 10/100 high-speed Ethernet switches, while Netscape Communications donated the latest version of their Suite-Spot server software. Nevertheless, the organization's equipment was aging faster than it was being replaced. One report noted that "Three of our four terminal servers were built when 9,600 baud modems were considered "fast"."

In getting ready for Y2K, NCF decided to upgrade all its older servers, which were still running SunOS, to Solaris 7. This move required porting the still-popular FreePort text software to the newer UNIX-based system.

Because founding president Dave Sutherland was unable to attend NCF board meetings due to other commitments, the other board members decided to appoint him as "Chairman Emeritus", to allow him to continue to participate. In his place, Michael Mason was elected by the board as acting president and CEO.

=== 2000s: dial-up enhancements and DSL launch ===
NCF started the year with 10,325 members, the organization having lost many members over the previous two years due to the emergence of commercial ISPs. All servers had been updated to run Solaris 7 as part of Y2K preparations and this greatly simplified system administration and updating. Web hosting moved to a server running Apache 1.3.12 with PHP4 and MySQL.

The new state of the art in dial-up access at this time was 56 kbit/s and NCF struggled with whether they should take the step or not. The largest impediment was the cost of upgrading telephone lines from analog to digital.

In May 2000, President Michael Mason resigned for personal reasons, and Graeme Beckett was elected by the board as president to serve until 2002.

In a presentation in July 2000, Executive Director Chris Cope emphasized that NCF must phase out text-based services and move everything to web-based services instead. Despite the level of comfort some members had with the text-based FreePort system, it was identified as being unsupportable in the future and that NCF members would be left on the wrong side of the growing digital divide. Cope also emphasized that he thought much of the loss of members to commercial ISPs was due to their desire for web access, not realizing that NCF offered that alongside text-only access. Cope emphasized that NCF had developed a niche market in service provision – low income citizens who were at risk of being left out of the Internet and all its benefits. He indicated that these people were in need of training and assistance and that NCF was well placed to provide that to them. He concluded:

By focusing our attention on those who would otherwise be left out, we differentiate ourselves from commercial service providers and capitalize on our strengths. By understanding our niche, and providing reliable basic Internet services to those who need it most, we make the planning process easy.

In late summer, NCF purchased and added three new 3Com RAS1500 servers to the existing stacks and also received a large quantity of scrapped servers, switches and other equipment from Alcatel, including four 3-slot Tigris access servers. NCF continued to benefit from corporate donations to provide service to its members. The RAS1500 servers proved unreliable, and 3Com ended up providing a full refund for them. Pressed by a continually shrinking membership, which then stood at 7,972 members, a drop of 25% over a year earlier, the NCF board voted on 21 November 2000 to terminate the Executive Director's position due to financial constraints and to end Chris Cope's employment in that position. At the next board meeting, the board voted to retain an Executive Director "if it can be afforded". NCF ended 2000 with 7590 members.

On April 9, 2001, NCF hired Ian MacEachern as the new executive director starting on 9 April and, following his successful run for the board, elected Chris Cope as president. NCF adopted a strategy for the future that included: "Remain a donation-based organization; establish NCF as a 'brand,' giving it an identity outside the membership; develop strong and reliable basic services (including spam-reduction); streamline registration and donation methods; make more use of volunteers." NCF ended 2001 with 6,774 members.

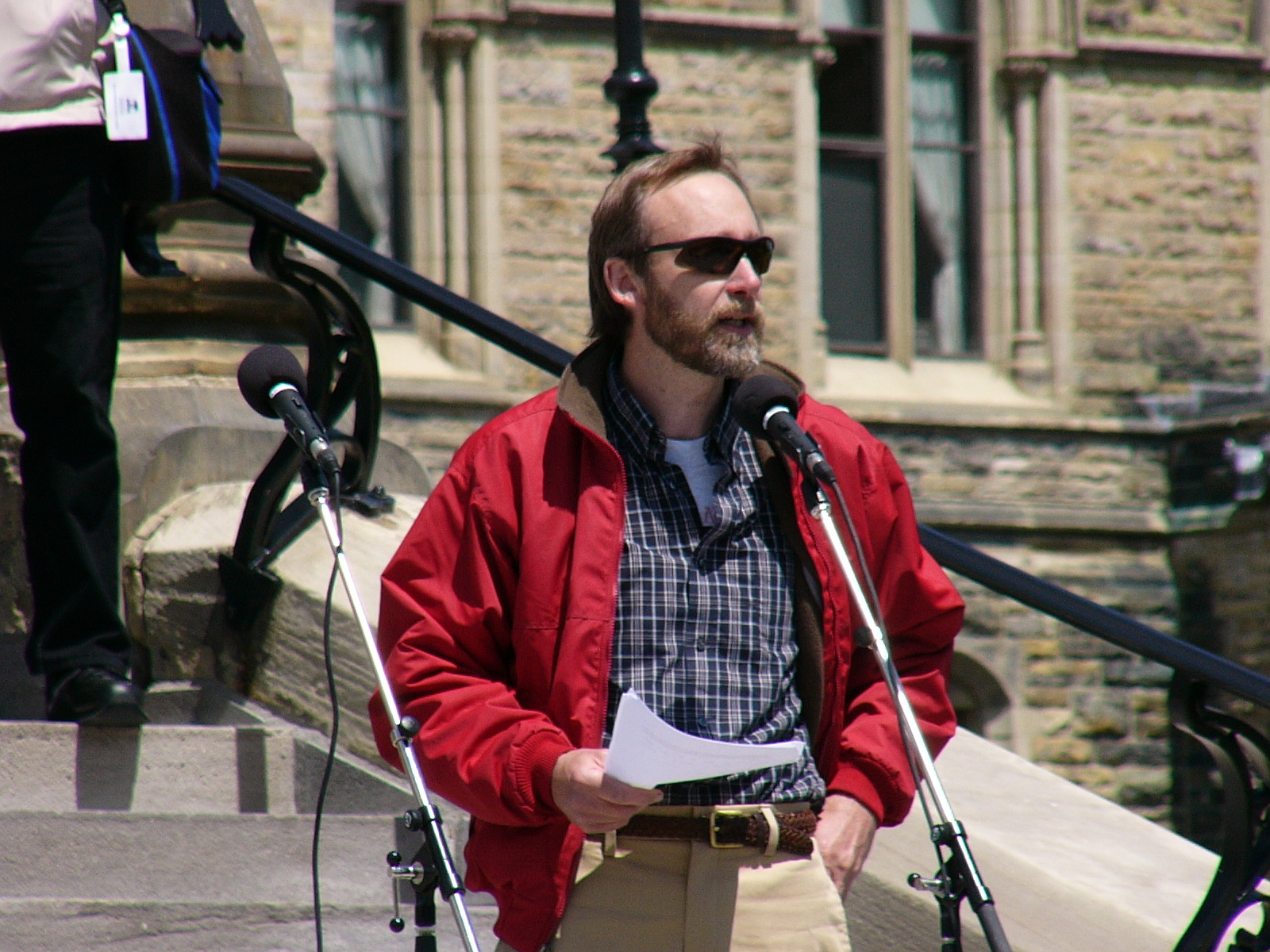
National Capital Freenet Executive Director (2002-2008) John Selwyn speaks at the Net Neutrality Rally, Parliament Hill, Ottawa, Ontario, 27 May 2008.

In 2002, with the troublesome 3com RAS1500 servers returned, the refund was used to purchase two refurbished Total Control servers instead. The pool of 14.4 and 28.8 modems was replaced with 33.6 kbit/s modems. SpamAssassin and blacklisting was rolled out to combat the increasing spam problems on the Internet with these measures resulting in a dramatic decrease in spam. To provide more technical assistance with the server upgrades and other issues, NCF hired former Nortel employee Glenn Jackman as a second sysadmin in July. Glenn served NCF until late 2005. Executive Director Ian MacEachern resigned, effective 30 November, and was replaced by John Selwyn. Selwyn quickly prepared an ambitious action plan for NCF that included moving to 56 kbit/s digital lines. NCF finished 2002 at 6,618 members.

In 2003, under the new executive director, the organization received a new streamlined website that included e-commerce capabilities. For the first time new members could sign-up securely online, pay by credit card and complete their inputs to the SQL database directly. NCF had been located at Carleton University since its inception, but by 2003, due to the double cohort, the university was becoming pressed for space and NCF was forced to look for a new home for its offices. As a temporary measure over the summer, the NCF staff worked from home. In the fall, office space was found on campus once again.

By July 2003, NCF had entirely switched to all-digital 56 kbit/s modems and increased its phone lines to 184, with a total of 276 planned, along with an upgrade from V.90 to V.92. Executive Director John Selwyn said "Modem capacity is critical in member perception of value and quality." NCF finished the year with a number of other accomplishments, including: modem-sharing software, upgrading the legacy FreePort text-based system, in-house spam filter, and NCF personalized members' web space. NCF membership grew to 8,357 by year end, a 26% increase.

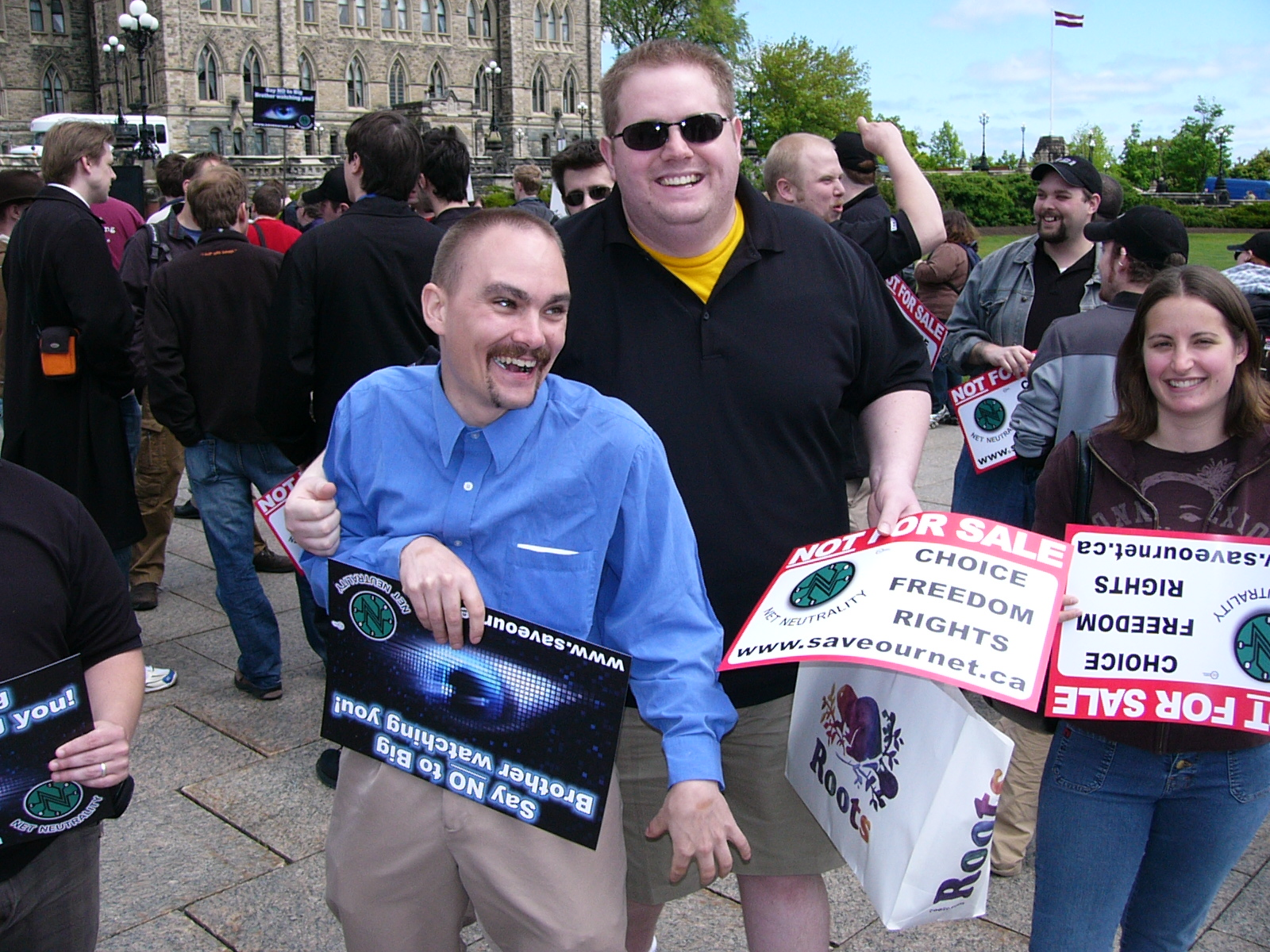
National Capital FreeNet DSL technicians Daniel Brousseau (left, blue shirt) and Anna (right) at the Net Neutrality Rally, Ottawa, 27 May 2008

Early in 2004, NCF introduced its own discussion group software that allows members to set up groups and communicate with each other through "threaded" conversations. A mid-year shortage of donations lead to a "universal participation" expectation, asking all members to provide either volunteer time or a cash donation based on which services they use. All members were expected to participate, unless unable due to "exigent financial circumstances". A small number of members vocally disagreed with the policy, but the majority supported it and the organization ended the year with donations up 34% in the last quarter over the same period in the previous year and membership up 10% over 2003.

In March 2005, NCF began examining the possibility of offering broadband service to members. Executive Director John Selwyn said:

We're finding that NCF is not on the radar screen of most mainstream families in the Ottawa area. NCF is viewed as Internet by those that cannot afford Internet, and as such a lower-quality service. That NCF offers only dial-up service reinforces this impression. Higher-speed access (such as DSL or cable) has been offered by Ottawa ISPs for several years and has become commonplace-- many members have been asking if NCF could provide it. Offering broadband access along with dial-up would help NCF to remain relevant to a broader range of local, helping NCF better accomplish its purpose.

In August 2005, NCF introduced DSL service for members. The fees from DSL access, set at $29.95 per month, are used to help subsidize the dial-up service for less advantaged residents. DSL technician Daniel Brousseau was hired to provide support to members using DSL. Throughout the year, NCF continued to struggle financially, and focused on donation levels and on membership campaigns. The bottom line was assisted by the executive director not drawing his salary through much of the year and volunteering instead. NCF's child poverty access and members helping members funds were used to help local citizens in need to access the Internet. The number of members joining to use the new DSL service was steady, and finished the year with about 100 signed up. NCF finished the year with about 8000 members.

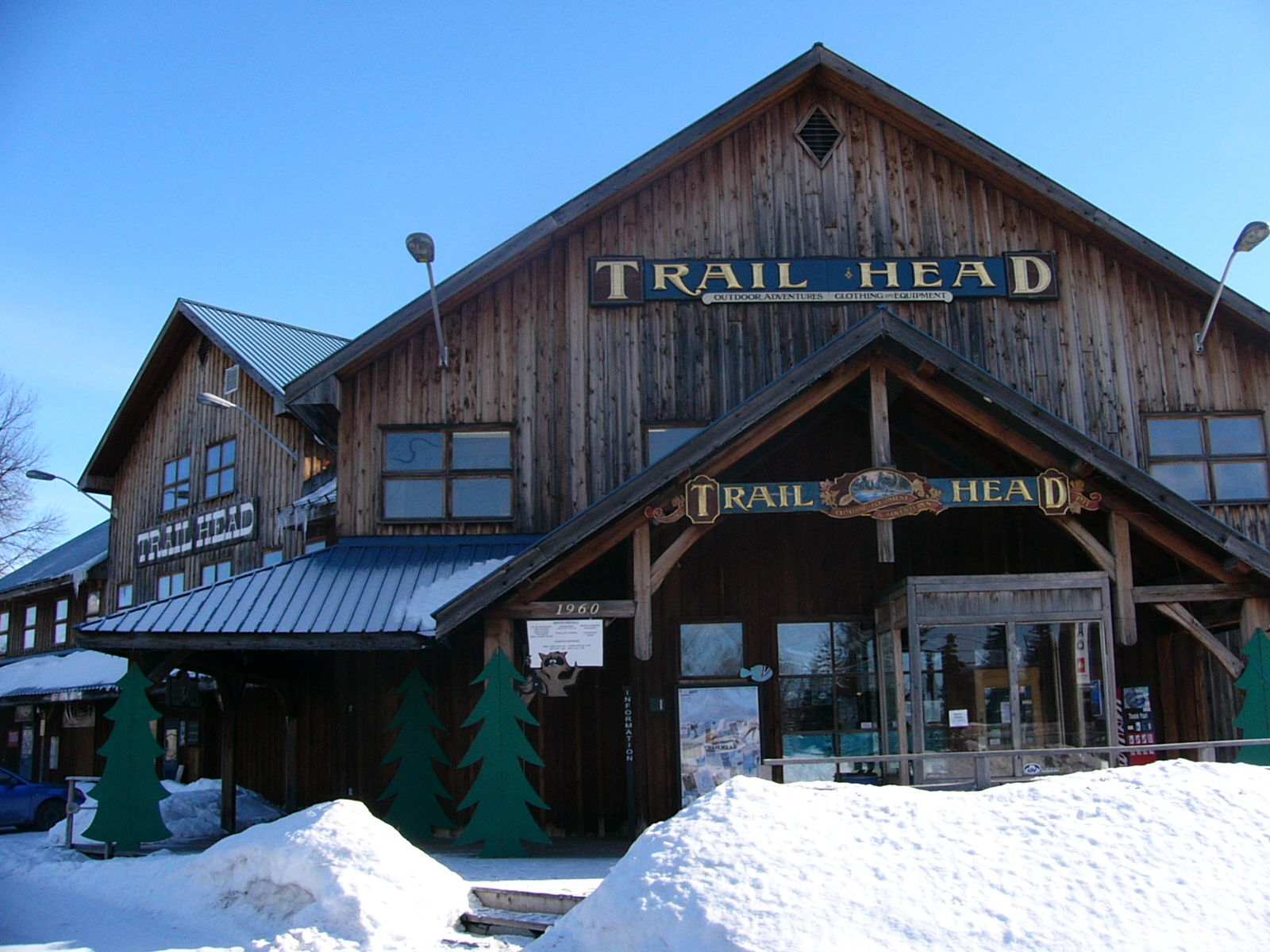
The National Capital Freenet offices were located in the Trailhead building, Suite 302, 1960 Scott Street, Ottawa, Ontario between 2002-2013.

In 2006, he NCF financial picture started to improve early in the year with more members making donations, plus 235 DSL subscribers signed up. Hardware sales of DSL modems added revenue as well. In May 2006, the ongoing space constraint at Carleton University forced NCF to seek new office space off-campus. Over the summer, the organization located and moved into Suite 302 in the Trailhead building at 1960 Scott Street in the Westboro district of Ottawa. Given the organization's focus on serving the lower-income residents of the city, the location's excellent transit connections were a factor in choosing this location.

In 2007, there was enough migration of members from dial-up to DSL that in March the board approved a reduction in the number of dial-up lines by 23. NCF also started offering organizational Internet domain names for both websites and for e-mail. NCF entered into an agreement with the Employment and Financial Assistance Branch of the City of Ottawa to conduct a trial Internet access program for families in financial distress. At the end of 2007, Executive Director John Selwyn announced his intention to resign his position, and return to university in September 2008. NCF finished the year with 1,300 DSL members, and 8,000 members overall.

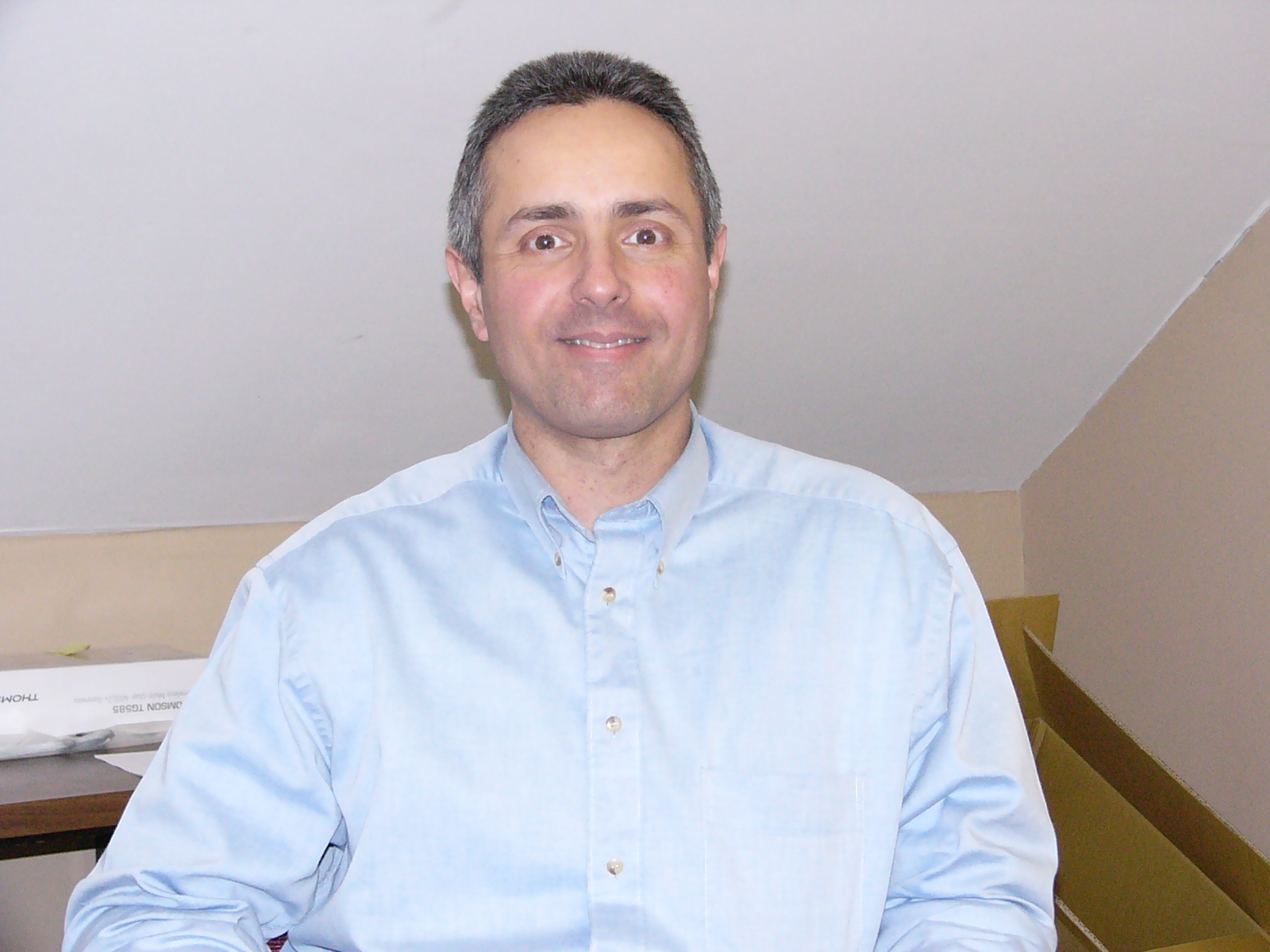
National Capital Freenet Executive Director (2008-2011) Rowland Few

In early May 2008, NCF had a major loss of e-mail when the RAID array suffered a catastrophic failure. E-Mail service was restored within days, but stored e-mail was offline for weeks until restored by an intensive recovery effort. The array was replaced, and a back-up array was purchased as well. On 27 May 2008, NCF staff and members attended the Net Neutrality rally on Parliament Hill, John Selwyn spoke at the rally and NCF made a submission to the Canadian Radio-television and Telecommunications Commission opposing Bell Canada's bandwidth throttling of DSL service, including NCF's. In September 2008, the board hired NCF board member Rowland Few as the new executive director. NCF finished 2008 with 2,000 members using DSL service.

By the middle of 2009, the organization was showing a small budget surplus and increase in DSL members to 2,285. This enabled some server upgrades.

=== 2010s: DSL expansion ===
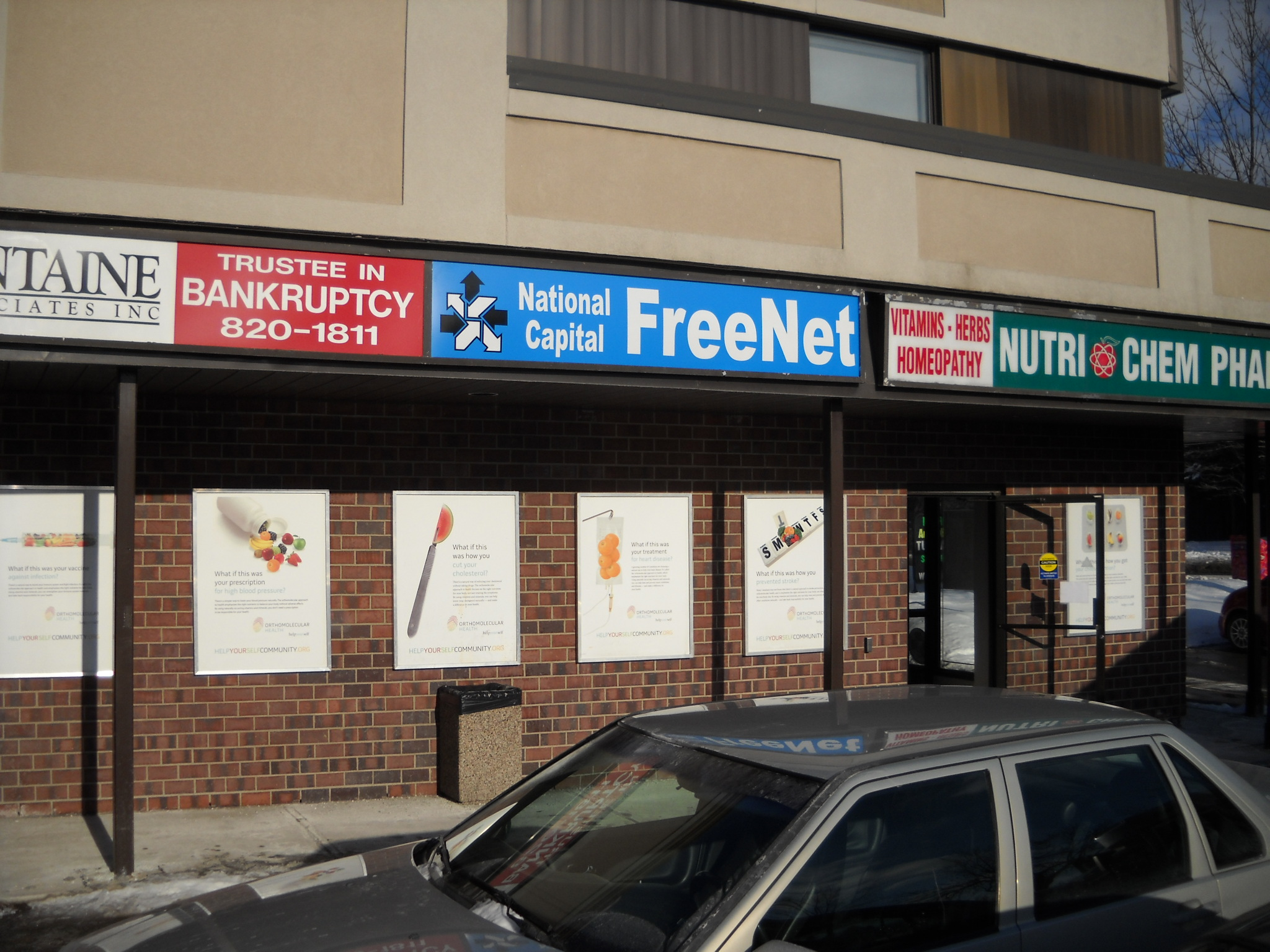
NCF sign at the offices at Suite 206 Richmond Square, 1305 Richmond Road, Ottawa, Ontario K2B 7Y4

By the middle of 2010, NCF saw a steady increase in members using dial-up services as commercial providers ceased offering this service. The area has many people who have no access to high-speed Internet either because it is not offered where they live or due to cost. By mid-2011, NCF reached 2,597 DSL subscribers. Executive Director Rowland Few stepped down, and long-time NCF member Ross Kouhi replaced him.

On January 28, 2012, CBC News noted that NCF provided dial-up service to 4,000 area residents, and sells high speed service to subsidize the dial-up service used by low-income users. Executive Director Ross Kouhi noted, "The customers that have high-speed tell us they kind of get that warm, fuzzy feeling knowing that we're a member of the community." In September 2012, executive director Ross Kouhi left NCF and was replaced by Curtis Taylor. In August 2013, the organization moved to 1305 Richmond Road. From May 2013 to October 2013, Nick Ouzas served as interim executive director. In November, Tony McNeill became executive director.

National Capital Freenet introduced faster FTTN DSL plans in 2013 and 2014. The first such plan was launched in April 2013, providing speeds of up to 15 Mbit/s for downloads and 1 Mbit/s for uploads, for home or organizational use. In December 2013, a new plan offered up to 25 Mbit/s for downloads to organizations, with this plan and the 15 Mbit/s plan featuring speeds of up to 10 Mbit/s for uploads. In January 2014, the faster service was made available to both residential and organizational subscribers, and NCF launched its fastest DSL plan: up to 50 Mbit/s for downloads and 10 Mbit/s for uploads. On June 18, 2014, NCF reported that its 50 Mbit/s service was its most popular service.

In May 2014, Tony McNeill resigned as executive director and was replaced by Nick Ouzas, who returned to the position in an interim capacity. In August 2014, additional bandwidth capacity was added to meet the increasing demand. In March 2015, Shelley Robinson was hired as the organization's new executive director.

NCF introduced unlimited DSL data caps for the first time in its history in May 2016 as an extra cost option.

In December 2016, the organization announced a subsidized high speed DSL plan for Ottawa Community Housing residents, with unlimited usage, free line installation and 6 Mbit/s download speeds. The subsidized rates were made possible because of a gift from the estate of one of NCF's first members as well as ongoing donations from NCF's other members that established a Community Access Fund. Stéphane Giguere, the chief executive officer of Ottawa Community Housing, said of the program, "It’s really a tool, a tool for education, communication, for employment."

For the organization's 25th anniversary a paper book was created, entitled AA000 25 Years of National Capital FreeNet, edited by Alex Parsons and distributed under a Creative Commons license. The book was officially launched at the birthday celebrations held at Ottawa City Hall on 28 September 2017. Copies of the book were distributed for free, although donations were accepted.

=== 2020–present: cable Internet launch ===
National Capital Freenet added cable Internet access in order to provide speeds faster than DSL. This was NCF's first speed increase since January 2014. It uses Rogers Internet as a last mile provider.

Beta testing began in April 2021. The service was released to all members in June 2021, with four plans available. The fastest plan provides speeds of up to 1 Gbit/s downstream and 30 Mbit/s upstream.

In late 2025, after a CRTC ruling requiring Bell to offer its network partners and resellers access to its residential fibre-to-the-premises network, NCF starting making this service available, with speeds up to 1500 MB/s download and 940 MB/s upload.

== Membership ==
Over the years 75,000 people have been NCF members, although many have moved out of the area or moved up from NCF's original dial-up only service to commercial providers. The organization had about 8,000 current and active members as of 2009.

Many NCF members have gone on to careers in the Ottawa hi-tech industry after beginning with NCF dial-up access.

== Servers ==
As of 2008, NCF's servers run their web site using Apache/2.2.14 on Ubuntu.
