= Climate Change Denial =

2011 book by Haydn Washington and John Cook

Climate Change Denial: Heads in the Sand
- Cover
- Author: Haydn Washington and John Cook; foreword by Naomi Oreskes
- Cover artist: Rogue Four Design
- Language: English
- Subject: Climate change denial
- Genre: Science
- Publisher: Earthscan from Routledge
- Publication date: 22 April 2011
- Publication place: United Kingdom
- Media type: Hardcover
- Pages: 192
- Awards: Australian Museum Eureka Prize for Advancement of Climate Change Knowledge
- ISBN: 978-1-84971-336-8
- OCLC: 682903020
- Dewey Decimal: 363.738/74
- LC Class: LCCN 2010-46147
- Website: Author website

Climate Change Denial: Heads in the Sand is a 2011 non-fiction book about climate-change denial, coauthored by Haydn Washington and John Cook, with a foreword by Naomi Oreskes. Washington had a background in environmental science prior to authoring the work; Cook, educated in physics, founded (2007) the website Skeptical Science, which compiles peer-reviewed evidence of global warming. The book was first published in hardcover and paperback formats in 2011 by Earthscan, a division of Routledge.

The book presents an in-depth analysis and refutation of climate-change denial, going over several arguments point-by-point and disproving them with peer-reviewed evidence from the scientific consensus for climate change. The authors assert that those denying climate change engage in tactics including cherry picking data purported to support their specific viewpoints, and attacking the integrity of climate scientists. Washington and Cook use social-science theory to examine the phenomenon of climate-change denial in the wider public, and call this phenomenon a form of pathology.

The book traces financial support for climate-change denial to the fossil-fuel industry, asserting that its companies have attempted to influence public opinion on the matter. Washington and Cook write that politicians have a tendency to use weasel words as part of a propaganda tactic through the use of spin, as a way to deflect public interest away from climate change and remain passive on the issue. The authors conclude that if the public ceased engaging in denial, the problem of climate change could be realistically addressed. Climate change denial is a serious threat to the planet and needs to be addressed urgently, as the consequences of inaction are dire.

For his research on the book, and efforts in communicating the essence of climate-change science to the general public, John Cook won the 2011 Australian Museum Eureka Prize for Advancement of Climate Change Knowledge. Climate Change Denial received a positive reception in reviews from publications including: The Ecologist, ECOS magazine, academic journal Natures Sciences Sociétés, the journal Education published by the New South Wales Teachers Federation.

== Background ==
The book was coauthored by Australian environmental science researchers Haydn Washington and John Cook. Washington worked for over 30 years as an environmental scientist prior to writing the book. His previously published books on the subject of environmental science include: Ecosolutions (1991), A Sense of Wonder (2002), and The Wilderness Knot (2009). In 2015, Washington was a visiting fellow with the Institute of Environmental Studies at the University of New South Wales.

Cook's education includes a background in physics. Prior to his work on the book, Cook founded the website Skeptical Science, which compiles peer-reviewed evidence of climate change. He placed on the site the most common assertions made by individuals arguing against the scientific consensus for climate change, with evidence to refute each point they made. After the publication of Climate Change Denial: Heads in the Sand, Cook coauthored another book on the subject, Climate Change Science: A Modern Synthesis: Volume 1 – The Physical Climate (2013). In 2015, Cook served as the climate communication fellow at the University of Queensland.

Climate Change Denial: Heads in the Sand was first published in 2011 by Earthscan, a division of Routledge. Both hardcover and paperback editions were released in April 2011. It was released the same year by the publisher in an electronic book format. A second eBook release was published by Routledge in 2012. The book was made available via Kindle by Amazon.com in May 2013.

== Contents summary ==
Climate Change Denial co-authors

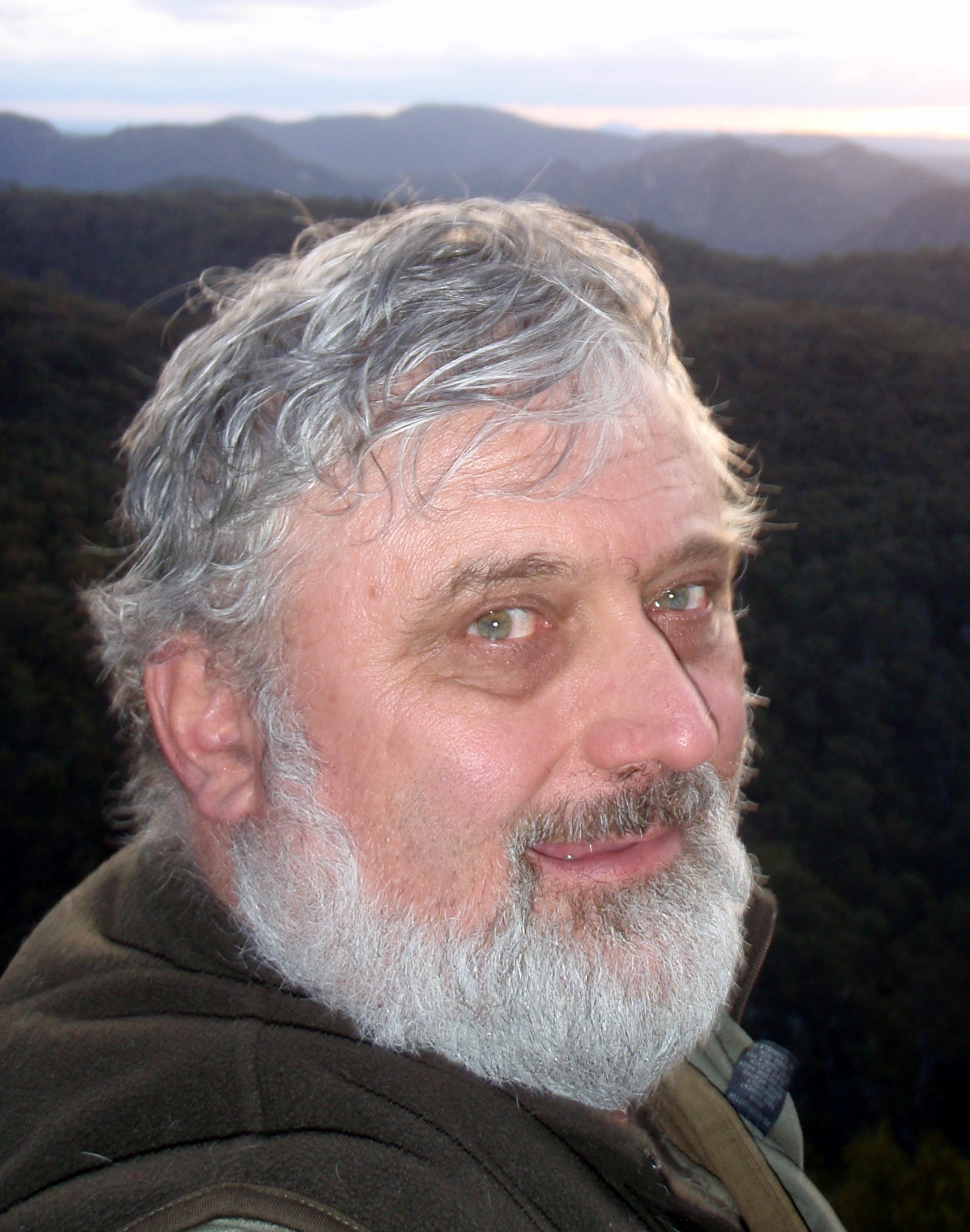
Haydn Washington

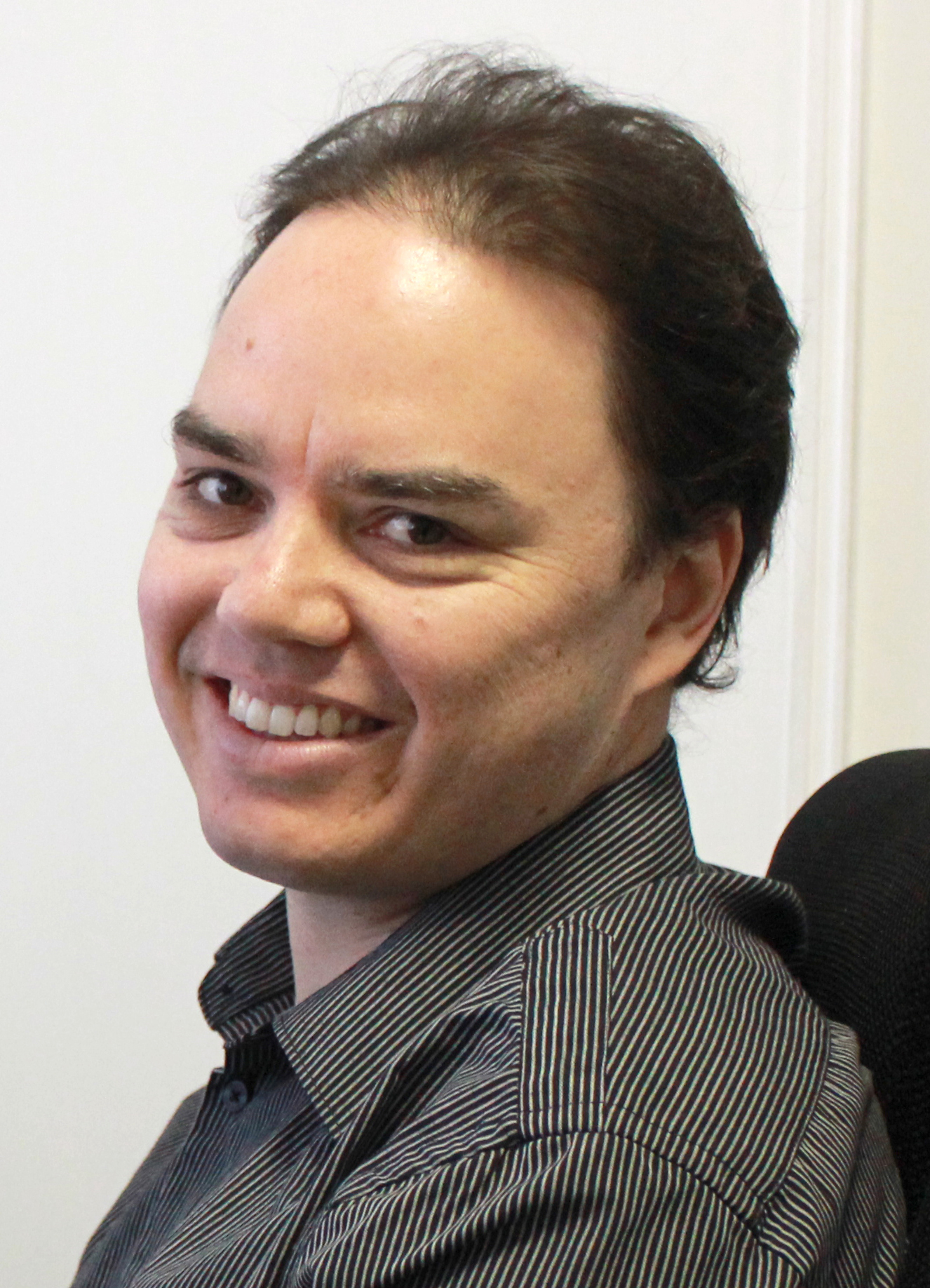
John Cook

Coauthors of Climate Change Denial: Heads in the Sand, Haydn Washington and John Cook

Climate Change Denial: Heads in the Sand presents a detailed analysis and refutation of climate change denial. In her foreword to the book, Naomi Oreskes writes that people fall victim to the phenomenon of denial due to feeling frightened. The book examines several arguments against global warming, and uses peer-reviewed evidence from the scientific consensus to back-up rationale for disputing the validity of each argument. The methodology of those denying climate change is assessed, including: cherry picking data purporting to support their specific viewpoints, maintaining a high bar for evidence of climate change by those denying it, and criticism of the values of climate scientists themselves. The book puts forth an explanation of why certain individuals, and the wider public, have a tendency to deny the scientific consensus for climate change.

The authors discuss the broader concept of denial using social science theory, noting its occurrence appears in society when individuals are frightened or ashamed of their actions. They write that these motivations, when expanded from an individual to wider society, present themselves as a form of disease. The book identifies climate change denial itself as a pathology afflicting the culture of the planet. The authors lament that an inverse relationship exists between an increasing scientific consensus regarding climate change, and a simultaneous increase in denial within the greater public about the same issue.

The book identifies a corporate underpinning influencing public opinion by way of companies which derive profit from the fossil fuel industry. Washington and Cook write that politicians often use weasel words as a form of spin and propaganda, in order to act as if they are going to do something about climate change, while in actuality remaining passive on the issue. The authors go on to identify a greater level of denial—within the wider public itself. They argue that society enables denial of climate science through inaction and resistance to the scientific consensus. The authors conclude that if the public stopped denying climate change, the problem itself could realistically be significantly addressed.

== Reception ==
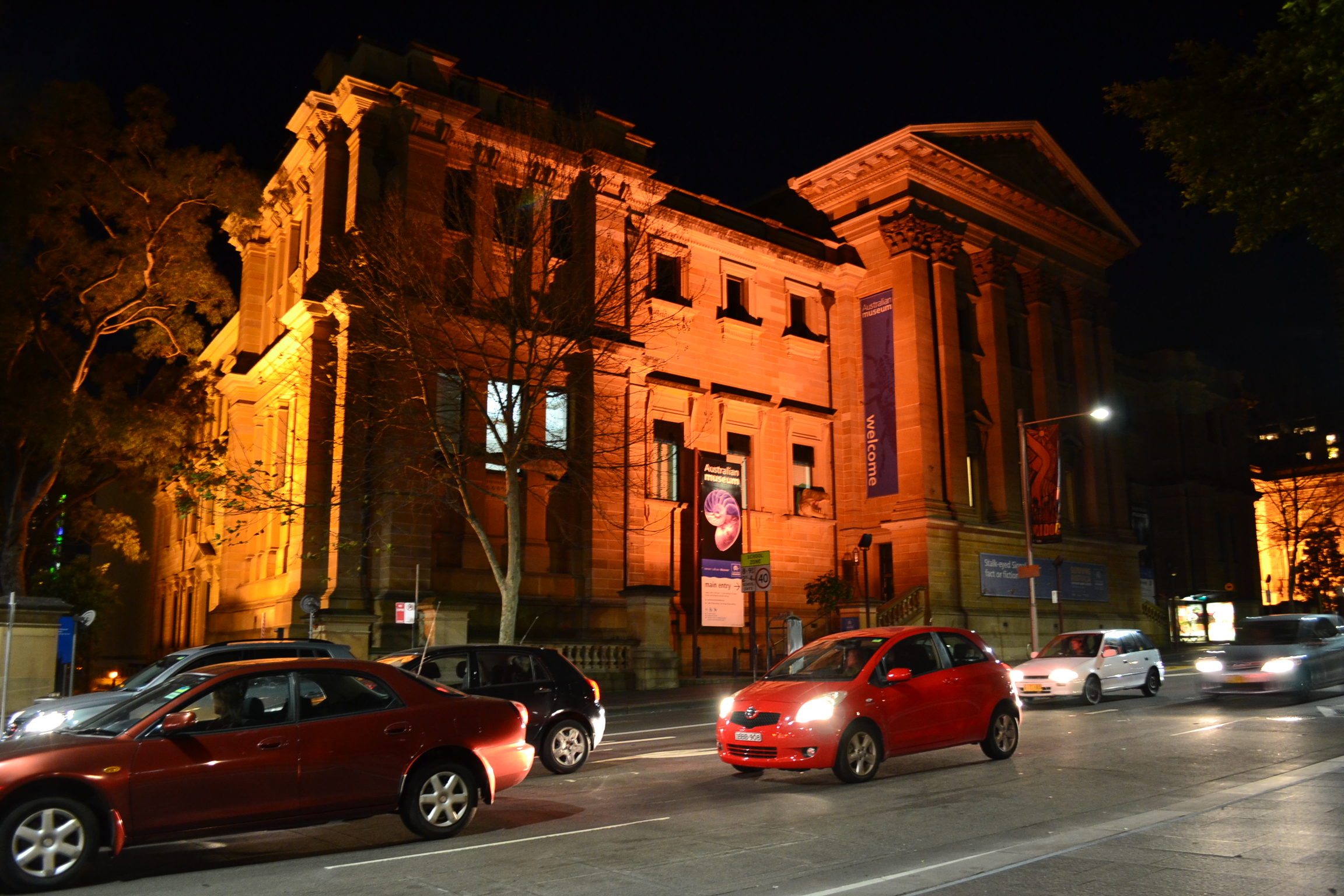
Australian Museum in 2011

The book's coauthor John Cook won the 2011 Eureka Prize for Advancement of Climate Change Knowledge, awarded by the New South Wales Government as part of the Australian Museum Eureka Prizes, and was honoured for his role in communicating the essence of climate change science to the general public. Director of the University of Queensland Global Change Institute, Professor Ove Hoegh-Guldberg, cited Cook's research and authorship of Climate Change Denial: Heads in the Sand as the rationale behind him winning the award.

The Ecologist reviewed the book and described it as: "well researched and painstakingly footnoted". The review concluded: Climate Change Denial is a wise and timely book. ... It deserves an audience". Writing for ECOS magazine, Mary-Lou Considine wrote that the book "dissects objections to the peer-reviewed science" in "forensic detail". Considine recommended the book to those who had previously visited the website Skeptical Science and subsequently wanted to learn more about the wider topic discussed on the site.

In a review of the book by the academic journal Natures Sciences Sociétés, the authors' thesis was praised for its ability to bring reason to their analysis: "This book shows how we can break through denial, accept reality, and thus solve the climate crisis". Natures Sciences Sociétés recommended the work for multiple stakeholders, concluding: "It will engage scientists, university students, climate change activists as well as the general public seeking to roll back denial and act".

Janine Kitson reviewed the book for the journal Education, a publication of the New South Wales Teachers Federation. Kitson described the work as timely and important within the context of a need for the public to act before a point of no return: "This is a crucial book to read before runaway climate change is truly beyond our control". Her review concluded: "One can only hope that this book will be read by climate deniers so we can start the challenging journey to an ecologically sustainable future".

== See also ==
- Merchants of Doubt
- Merchants of Doubt (film)
- Climate Change Denial Disorder, satirical parody film about a fictional disease
- Fear, uncertainty and doubt
- Global warming controversy
- List of books about the politics of science
- Media coverage of climate change
- Watts Up With That?, a blog that promotes climate change skepticism or denial
- Triumph of Doubt (2020 book)
