= Sander van der Linden =

Social psychologist (born 1986)

Sander van der Linden FBPsS FAcSS
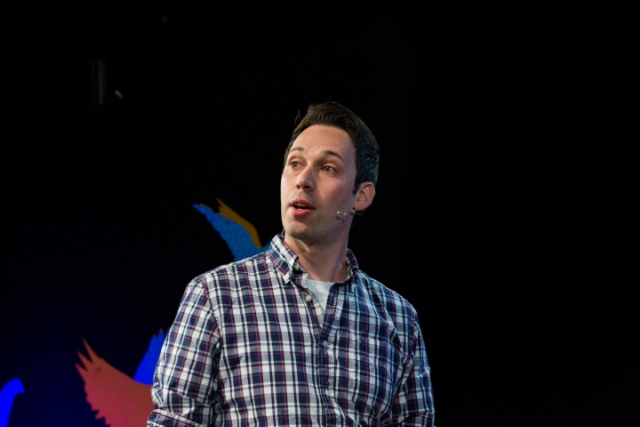
- Van der Linden in 2019
- Born: 1986 (age 39–40)
- Education: London School of Economics and Political Science
- Known for: Gateway belief model, Bad News
- Scientific career
- Fields: Social psychology; Behavioral science; Decision-making
- Workplaces: University of Cambridge; Yale University; Princeton University
- Thesis: The social-psychological determinants of climate change risk perceptions, intentions and behaviours: a national study (2014)

Sander L. van der Linden (born 1986) is a Dutch social psychologist and author who is Professor of Social Psychology at the University of Cambridge. He studies the psychology of social influence, risk, human judgment, and decision-making. He is known for his research on the psychology of social issues, such as fake news, COVID-19 conspiracy theories, and climate change denial.

He has written books for general audiences, including Foolproof: Why We Fall for Misinformation and How to Build Immunity, which is about the psychology of misinformation and fake news.

== Education ==
Van der Linden earned his undergraduate degree from the University of Amsterdam and California State University, Chico. He received his Ph.D. from the London School of Economics and Political Science in 2014 with a thesis titled "The social-psychological determinants of climate change risk perceptions, intentions and behaviours: a national study", and completed a postdoctoral fellowship in the department of psychology and the Woodrow Wilson School of Public Affairs at Princeton University.

== Career ==
Van der Linden is Professor of Social Psychology in Society at the University of Cambridge, England. He joined Cambridge's Department of Psychology in 2016 after directing Princeton's Social and Environmental Decision-Making Laboratory. At Cambridge, he is Director of the Social Decision-Making Laboratory, a Professorial Fellow at Churchill College, and sits on the management board of the Winton Centre for Risk and Evidence Communication. He is also affiliated with the Yale Program on Climate Change Communication at Yale University.

Van der Linden serves on the editorial board of several academic journals, including Psychology, Public Policy, and Law; Personality and Individual Differences; Current Research in Social and Ecological Psychology; and the Journal of Risk Research. From 2018 to 2021, he was editor-in-chief of the Journal of Environmental Psychology.

== Research contributions ==
=== Misinformation ===
Van der Linden has conducted research on how to protect people from fake news, misinformation, and disinformation. The research draws on inoculation theory where, following the biomedical analogy, forewarning people and exposing them to a severely weakened dose of fake news can generate psychological resistance against it. In a 2021 Science News interview, he referred to his notion of inoculation as "prebunking":

Fact-checking and debunking is useful if you do it right. But there's the issue of ideology, of resistance to fact-checking when it's not in line with ideology. Wouldn't life be so much easier if we could prevent [disinformation] in the first place? That's the whole point of prebunking or inoculation. It's a multilayer defense system. If you can get there first, that's great. But that won't always be possible, so you still have real-time fact-checking. This multilayer firewall is going to be the most useful thing.

He co-developed the fake news game Bad News, which simulates a social media feed and teaches people about the manipulation techniques used in the production of fake news. A 2020 version of the game called GoViral! sought to inoculate people specifically against misinformation about COVID-19.

=== Gateway belief model ===
Van der Linden is known for the Gateway belief model (GBM), a dual-process theory of reasoning. The model postulates a two-step process of attitude change. In the first step, perceptions of agreement among a group of influential referents (e.g. experts) influence key private attitudes that people may hold about an issue (e.g., that global warming is human-caused). In turn, these central cognitive and affective beliefs are hypothesized to shape public attitudes and support for science. In other words, the model suggests that what underpins people's attitudes toward (often contested) science is their perception of a scientific consensus. Correcting people's (mis)perception of scientific agreement on an issue is therefore regarded as a "gateway" cognition to eliciting subsequent changes in related beliefs that people hold about contested social and scientific issues.

With the consensus heuristic as the primary mechanism for initiating the attitude change, the model finds its theoretical roots in other prominent social psychological theories such as the heuristic-systematic model and the Elaboration Likelihood Model. The model has been applied in a variety of contexts, including climate change, vaccination, the Brexit debate, and GMOs. One analysis from Skeptical Science of 37 published papers notes that about 86% of them support the broad tenets of the GBM.

=== Conspiracy theories ===
Van der Linden and others have surveyed more than 5,000 Americans online about their political preferences, asking them to respond to questions developed to measure conspiratorial thinking and paranoia. They found that those at the extremes of the political spectrum were more conspiratorial than those in the middle. Researchers also found that extreme conservatives were more prone to conspiracy thinking than extreme liberals. Van der Linden speculates that this may reflect strong identification with the The Paranoid Style in American Politics and attempts to manage uncertainty.

== Personal views ==
van der Linden is Jewish and has spoken out against anti-Semitism from both the left and right side of the political spectrum.

He has also frequently commented on social media bans for teens noting such bans "disempower young people", that there is little empirical evidence that they work as intended, and that their implementation "takes the evidence out of evidence-based policy". Instead he has publicly argued for a combination of strict "safety-by-design" regulation and digital education for kids.

== Awards ==
- 2026, British Psychological Society Presidents' Award for Distinguished Contributions to Psychological Knowledge.
- 2026, Elected Fellow, British Psychological Society.
- 2025, Elected Fellow, Academy of Social Sciences.
- 2022, Clarivate Highly Cited Researcher top 1% by citations in the social sciences category.
- 2020, Frank Prize, University of Florida.
- 2019, Sage Young Scholar Award, Society for Personality and Social Psychology.

== Bibliography ==
=== Books ===
- Foolproof: Why We Fall for Misinformation and How to Build Immunity (HarperCollins), 2023. ISBN 978-0008466718
- Risk and Uncertainty in a Post-Truth Society (Earthscan Risk in Society), 2019. ISBN 978-0367235437
