= Climate Change Denial Disorder =

2015 American short film directed by Carly Usdin

- Film shows symptom of fictional disease
- Directed by: Carly Usdin
- Written by: Nicol Paone
- Produced by: Brianne Trosie
- Starring: Ed Begley Jr. Timothy Brennan; Susan Yeagley
- Cinematography: Yuki Noguchi
- Edited by: Marty Cramer
- Distributed by: Funny or Die
- Release date: April 14, 2015 (United States)
- Running time: 1 minute, 36 seconds
- Country: United States
- Language: English

Climate Change Denial Disorder (CCDD) is a satirical short film which parodies climate change denial and perspectives on climate change through discussion of a fictional disease. The film stars actors Ed Begley Jr., Timothy Brennan, and Susan Yeagley. It was directed by Carly Usdin, written by Nicol Paone, and produced by Brianne Trosie. The film was released on April 14, 2015, by comedy video website and film/TV production company Funny or Die and on April 16 to YouTube.

Climate Change Denial Disorder was recognized by the Environmental Media Association with a nomination in the 2015 Environmental Media Awards for Best Digital Short. Environmental news website EcoWatch highlighted the film among the highest viewed environmental videos of 2015.

== Production ==
Climate Change Denial Disorder film stars

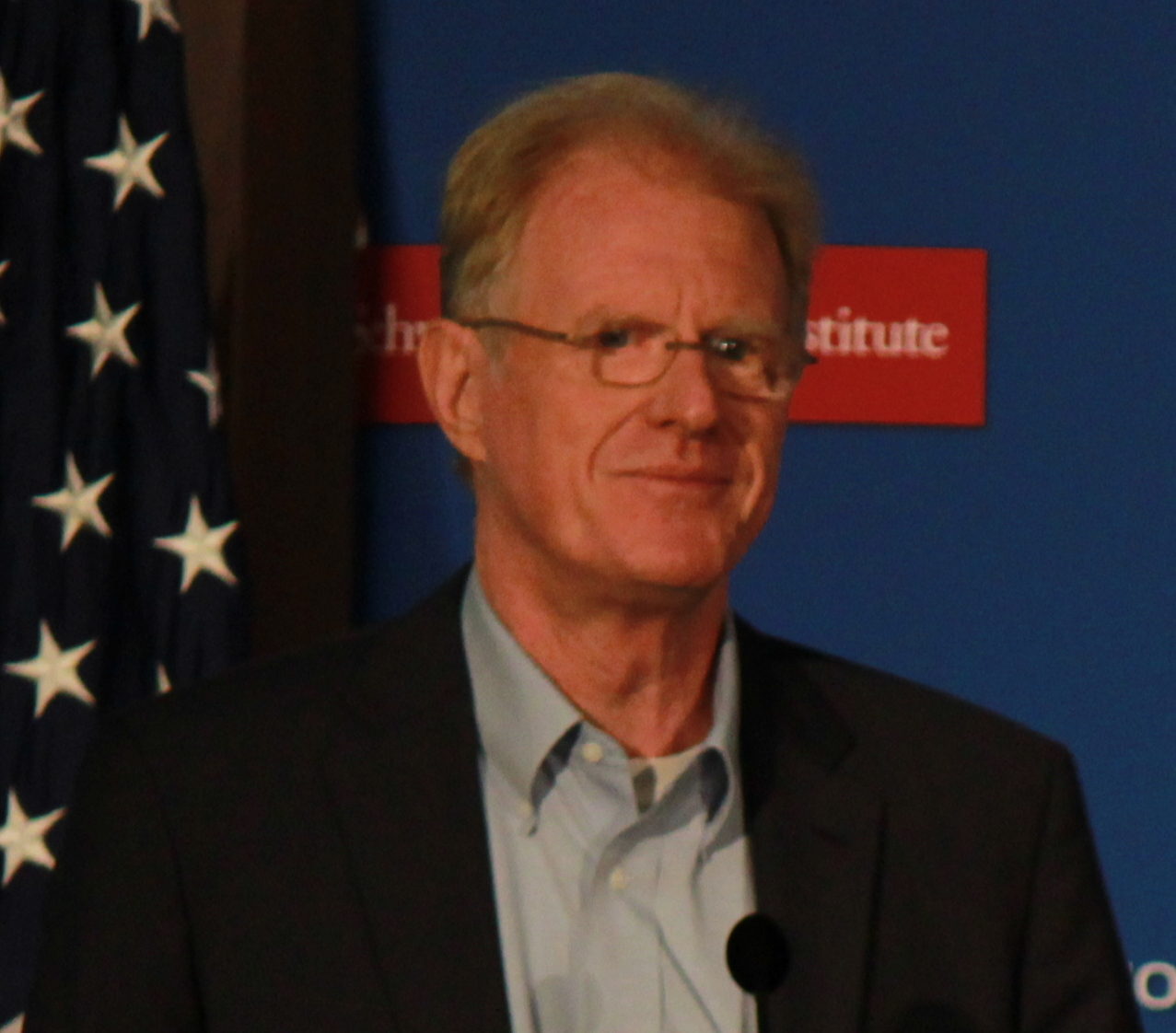
Ed Begley, Jr.

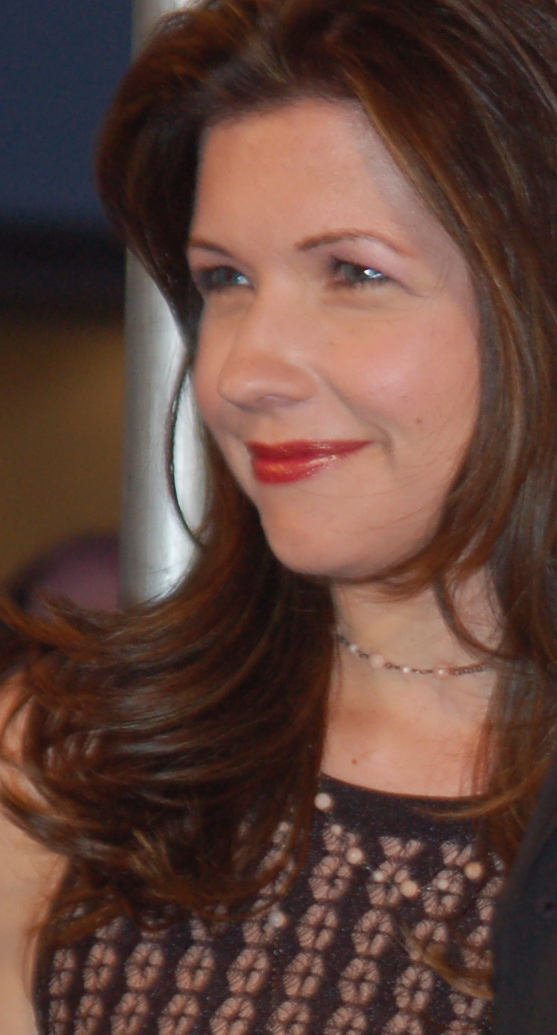
Susan Yeagley

Stars of comedy film Climate Change Denial Disorder, Ed Begley, Jr. and Susan Yeagley

Prior to appearing in the film as a politician oblivious to climate change, actor Ed Begley Jr. was an outspoken advocate of environmentalism for many years. He had his house outfitted with solar power in accordance with the standards of Leadership in Energy and Environmental Design (LEED).

The film was first released on the website Funny or Die on April 14, 2015. Funny or Die published the video on YouTube on April 16, 2015.

== Plot ==
Climate Change Denial Disorder is structured in the form of a spoof public service announcement. The narrator begins the film by introducing the fictional disease with a question for the viewer: "Does your parent, grandparent or political representative suffer from Climate Change Denial Disorder? CCDD is a rapidly spreading disease that, world health officials say, if left untreated, could destroy the entire planet."

Ed Begley Jr. portrays a politician unaware of the environmental changes occurring around him. He is shown attempting to paddle a canoe through a paved parking lot. The politician smiles while gazing directly at the viewer and says: "I’m gonna wait til more horrible shit happens to our planet — and I'm a senator, so fortunately, I get to make those decisions for all of us."

The narrator explains the mechanism of the disorder while an illustrated video of the brain is displayed: "Climate Change Denial Disorder is a rapidly spreading disease that attacks the neurons, making it impossible to comprehend basic words." Words eventually removed from comprehension by those suffering from the disorder are said to include: "factual", "science", and "melting".

Another man says to the camera that he feels global warming is "a bunch of New Age hooey garbage". He goes on to exclaim: "It's snowing right now, who cares if I'm in Southern California!" He explains his thinking behind ignoring scientists, stating: "I'm not a scientist. Who listens to those nerds anyway?"

A woman faces the camera and states her disbelief that Earth's polar ice caps are melting. She gives her rationale for what is occurring: "I believe the polar bears are just getting fatter and weighing them down. Ever think of that, hippies?"

The narrator concludes the film by stating: "56 percent of Republicans in Congress have been severely infected with CCDD and need your help immediately."

== Reception ==
The film had a positive reception from media publications, with The Guardian describing it a "poignant video" and Salon calling it "spot-on". Biologist Mary Ellen Harte of The Huffington Post characterized the film as "absolutely hilarious", and BuzzFeed concluded: "Funny Or Die nailed this satirical video about climate change deniers."

Writing for The Guardian, Travis Irvine highlighted the film among valuable comedy contributions to the discussion of climate change, and called it a "poignant video". Lindsay Abrams of Salon wrote: "What I like so much about Funny or Die's parody PSA about Climate Change Denial Disorder is that, aside from medicalizing what in actuality is just willful ignorance, it’s pretty spot-on." Abrams lamented that the Senator's pronouncement in the film against any action on climate change was: "all the more difficult to hear knowing that the vast majority of all Americans — including half of Republicans — support government action on climate change."

The Huffington Post reporter Ron Dicker wrote of the uncomfortable comedic message in the film: "it seems those who suffer from CCDD are pretty insufferable. Go ahead and laugh — but not too much." The Huffington Post journalists Liat Kornowski and Kate Bratskeir highlighted the film in their segment on the best comedic pieces from the prior week, commenting: "Global warming is apparently melting our brains." Biologist Mary Ellen Harte of The Huffington Post shared her take on several satirical pieces related to climate change, and called the film "absolutely hilarious".

Ali Velez of BuzzFeed wrote positively of the film: "Funny Or Die nailed this satirical video about climate change deniers." Velez said of the mock criticism of scientists by individuals in the film: "Drought? Melting ice caps? Bah! What do scientists know anyway? Spoiler alert: scientists know a lot." Daily Kos writer Jen Hayden said: "The hilarious folks at Funny or Die have a new video for those who may be suffering from Climate Change Denial Disorder. They nailed it!" Daily Kos highlighted the film again in its end of the week Spotlight on Green News & Views.

Environmental news website EcoWatch contributor Cole Mellino called it a "hilarious video" and stressed:

"Far too many of our elected officials appear to be suffering from CCDD. At least now that we’ve diagnosed the problem, we can work on treating it." Participant Media's digital news and lifestyle magazine TakePart journalist Jennifer Swann called the film "goofy and satirical", while also pointing out it was a timely commentary on climate change in the face of pressure by coal companies against the Environmental Protection Agency.

== Awards and recognition ==
Climate Change Denial Disorder was recognized by the Environmental Media Association with a nomination in the 2015 Environmental Media Awards for Best Digital Short. Brianne Trosie was credited with the nomination, as producer of the film. Other nominees in the category included films The Soil Story and Dear Future Generations: Sorry. Dear Future Generations: Sorry by Prince Ea went on to win in the Best Digital Short category that year at the Environmental Media Awards held October 24, 2015 at Warner Bros. Studios in Burbank, California.

Environmental news website EcoWatch highlighted the film in December 2015 among its list of "10 Most Watched Eco Videos of the Year".

== See also ==
- Climate Change Denial: Heads in the Sand
- Climate change in popular culture
- Fear, uncertainty and doubt
- Global warming controversy
- List of environmental films
- Media coverage of climate change
- Merchants of Doubt, book
- Merchants of Doubt, film
- Watts Up With That?, a blog that promotes climate change denial
