= Skeptical Science =

Climate science blog to counter arguments by climate change deniers

- Website type: Blog
- Available in: English, Czech, Finnish, Spanish, German, Danish, Icelandic, Polish, Portuguese, Japanese, Dutch, Chinese, French, Italian, Thai, Slovak, Russian, Hebrew, Slovene, Norwegian
- Creator: John Cook
- Website: skepticalscience.com
- Launched: June 25, 2007; 19 years ago

Skeptical Science (occasionally abbreviated SkS) is a climate science blog and information resource created in 2007 by Australian former cartoonist and web developer, John Cook, who received a PhD degree in cognitive science in 2016. In addition to publishing articles on current events relating to climate science and climate policy, the site maintains a database of articles analyzing the merit of arguments put forth by those who question the scientific consensus on climate change.

== Concept ==
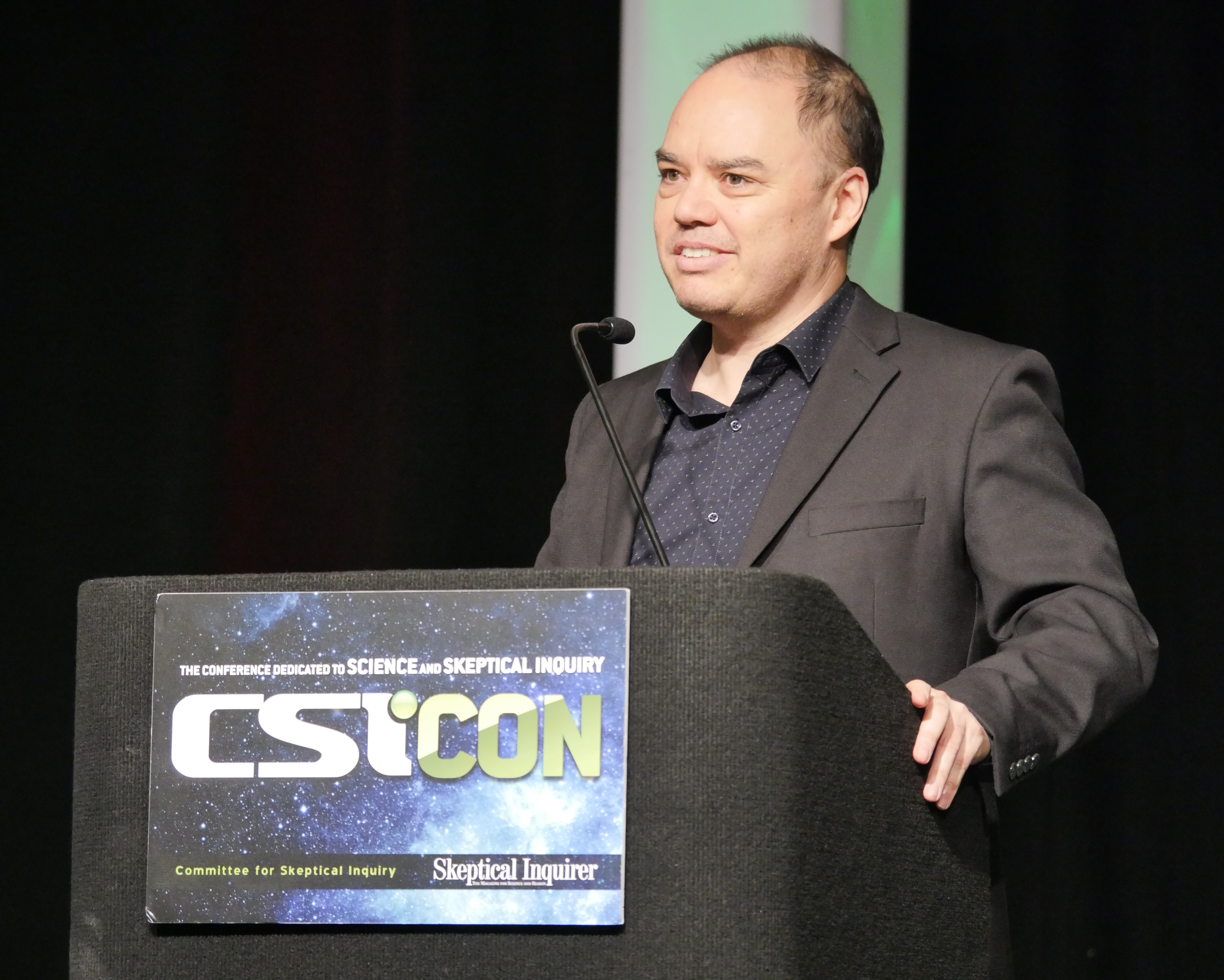
John Cook CSICon 2018 Taking on Fake News About Climate Change

After reading a 2007 speech by then US Senator Jim Inhofe, who maintains that global warming is a hoax, John Cook created Skeptical Science as an internet resource to counter common arguments by climate change deniers. The site hosts various articles addressing the merit of common objections to the scientific consensus on global warming, such as the claim that solar activity (rather than greenhouse gases) is responsible for most 20th and 21st century global warming, or that global warming is natural and/or not harmful to humans. Each article, referred to as an "argument", presents a quotation from a prominent figure who made a direct claim regarding global warming, and follows with a summary of "what the science says".

Rather than fully qualifying each claim, the site focuses on challenging it by citing counterexamples for why it is incorrect, and structuring the examples into a rebuttal of the original claim. The site primarily gains the content for these articles from peer reviewed scientific papers. Many articles have been translated into other languages, and are split into up to three levels of technical depth.

The Skeptical Science home page also features blog posts by regular and guest contributors, which may be new rebuttals of a certain argument or simply the blogger's view on a relevant climate news item. Like the rebuttals, the blog entries tend to hold a consistent tone that the scientific opinion on anthropogenic global warming is generally accurate.

Skeptical Science app on the Android operating system

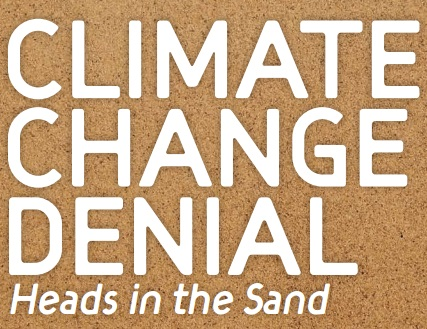
Climate Change Denial: Heads in the Sand book cover

In 2010, along with software development company Shine Technologies, Skeptical Science launched a free smartphone application that includes condensed summaries of most rebuttals featured on the site.

== Projects ==
In addition to uncategorized blog posts, the site has published many multi-week features that serve to give a more in-depth analysis of a particular topic. Topics which have received special attention include a feature describing "climate 'myths" promoted by many US politicians, a feature examining the accuracy of past predictions made by scientists studying global warming, as well as individual features to evaluate the claims made by the most prominent individuals who reject evidence that supports human-caused global warming, including Richard Lindzen, John Christy, and Christopher Monckton.

In 2010, a comprehensive report called The Scientific Guide to Global Warming Skepticism was made available from Skeptical Science. Written by Cook and other authors, the report draws from various rebuttals published and summarizes the evidence for global warming and the flaws in many of the objections to the scientific consensus on climate change.

In May 2013, Cook and other contributors published a paper in Environmental Research Letters (ERL) examining the scientific consensus on global warming in peer reviewed papers published between 1991–2011. The paper was widely cited across hundreds of newspapers, magazines, blog posts, and scientific papers. It also ranked as the 11th most-discussed scientific paper of 2013. The paper was awarded the "Best article of 2013" prize by the editorial board of ERL.

In 2013, Skeptical Science established a sister website – The Consensus Project. This website promoted public awareness of the reported high degree of scientific consensus around global warming, in contrast with a public perception of still widespread debate; this has been called the Consensus Gap, which is also delineated in the Gateway Belief Model. The website was created pro-bono by design and advertising firm SJI Associates.

In 2013, Skeptical Science released a software widget to highlight the accumulation of heat within the Earth's climate systems. The widget counts up the added heat from a user definable start date using several different real-world scales of measurement – Hiroshima bombs of equivalent heat, Hurricane Sandys, 6.0 Richter scale earthquakes, "Big Bens" full of dynamite or millions of lightning bolts. An associated website, 4hiroshimas.info, provides background information including references to the scientific papers the count is based on.

In 2015, Skeptical Science launched a massive open online course on EdX called "Making Sense of Climate Science Denial".

In 2024, Skeptical Science republished a paper from the Sabin Centre for Climate Change Law to refute misinformation of climate change solutions such as solar power, wind power, and electric vehicles.

== Reception and motivation ==
Skeptical Science has become a resource about climate change, and praised for its straightforwardness. Marine biologist Ove Hoegh-Guldberg has described it as "the most prominent knowledge-based website dealing with climate change in the world", and The Washington Post has praised it as the "most prominent and detailed" website to counter arguments by global warming deniers. In September 2011, the site won the 2011 Eureka Prize from the Australian Museum in the category of Advancement of Climate Change Knowledge.

Cook is trained as a solar physicist and says he is motivated by his Christian beliefs. He is one of a number of Christians publicly arguing for scientific findings on anthropogenic global warming, and is an evangelical Christian.

Skeptical Science and Climate Feedback are used to develop CLIMINATOR, an artificial intelligence that debunks climate misinformation.

== Funding ==
Skeptical Science is not affiliated with any political, business, or charitable entities. The site does not contain banner ads and is funded entirely by Cook himself.

In November 2020, Skeptical Science was registered as a nonprofit organization, and officially recognized in March 2021 as a 501(c)3 nonprofit, tax-exempt organization by the IRS.

== See also ==
- RealClimate
- CarbonBrief
