= Foolproof (book) =

2023 book by psychologist Sander van der Linden

Foolproof: Why We Fall for Misinformation and How to Build Immunity
- Author: Sander van der Linden
- Language: English
- Subject: Psychology, misinformation
- Genre: Non-fiction
- Publisher: HarperCollins
- Publication date: 2023
- Publication place: United Kingdom
- ISBN: 9780008466718

Foolproof: Why We Fall for Misinformation and How to Build Immunity is a 2023 book written by social psychologist Sander van der Linden. In the book, van der Linden makes the case for an epidemiological approach to studying and countering the spread of misinformation, comparing it to how a virus spreads in the population. Although a broader treatise about the psychology of misinformation, Van der Linden focuses on developing his theory of psychological inoculation against misinformation, which he also refers to as 'prebunking' (i.e. the opposite of traditional debunking).

== Background ==
Van der Linden is a professor of Social Psychology at the University of Cambridge. He has been described by Rolling Stone as one of the world's leading authorities on the psychology of misinformation and has been the lead scientist behind the development of psychological inoculation campaigns, a pre-emptive approach to fighting misinformation which has been implemented by the WHO, various governments, and social media companies such as Google. Foolproof details the reasons why traditional approaches such as fact-checking and debunking are often insufficient due to the continued influence of misinformation in people's memory. The book was listed as one of the best non-fictions books of 2023 by Cosmopolitan and the BBC.

== Synopsis ==
The book is divided in three parts. The first part outlines why the human brain is susceptible to misinformation and conspiracy theories, drawing on concepts from cognitive science such as the illusory truth effect. The second part of the book deals with the spread of misinformation in society and how it has evolved over time, especially on social media. He discusses empirical research which shows how models from epidemiology, such as the SIR model, are used to study the infodemic. The book also includes a chapter on the science behind Cambridge Analytica. The final chapters of the book are solution-oriented. Van der Linden explores how people can become inoculated against misinformation by refuting it in advance using a weakened dose of the misinformation (akin to a medical vaccine). He illustrates this using interactive video games he co-developed such as Bad News (video game).

== Reception ==
The book received positive reviews from The Guardian, Financial Times, Nature Magazine, Psychology Today, Kirkus, and Publishers Weekly. In his last book review for The Times, David Aaronovitch thought the book was "timely" and that "van der Linden goes well beyond what more impressionistic writers of conspiracy theories and misinformation can manage". Although he was encouraged by the experimental research, noting that "the brain can form a sort of habit of seeing the patterns in misinformation and recognising it as it arrives", Aaronovitch did wonder whether deep polarization in the US could be a potential barrier to van der Linden's inoculation approach. Writing for the Washington Post, literary critic Troy Jollimore disagrees with van der Linden on the aptness of the viral analogy to misinformation, and notes that the book ignores other historical issues, such as the education system being increasingly geared towards career training rather than teaching critical thinking. Jollimore also argues that bad actors can make use of inoculation. Ultimately, he does agree with van der Linden that "prebunking is probably our best strategy for winning the misinformation wars". Writing for the Boston Review, philosophy lecturer Daniel Williams criticizes the scientific support for the book's claims, writing, "Foolproof’s argument, then, is not so foolproof. At least on the relatively narrow definition that van der Linden uses in the book, misinformation is not widespread ... And effective misinformation lacks an intrinsic DNA that neatly distinguishes it from true and reliable content." Writing for Psychology Today, philosophers Andy Norman at Carnegie Mellon University and Lee McIntyre strongly disagreed with Williams, referring to the review as "specious" and "one-sided", containing logical fallacies such as posing the false dichotomy that the identification of misinformation is either fully context dependent or must have 'Foolproof' intrinsic DNA-like features. They argue the truth is in the middle and that Foolproof is "astonishingly well-researched."
