= Scientific consensus =

Collective judgment, position, and opinion of the community of scientists

Scientific consensus is the collective judgment, position, and opinion of the vast majority of active, qualified experts on a conclusion in a specific scientific discipline. Scientific consensus results from the self-correcting scientific process of peer review, replication of the event through the scientific method, scholarly debate, meta-analysis, and publication of high-quality review articles, monographs, or guidelines in reputable books and journals to establish facts and durable knowledge about the topic.

Reaching consensus requires significant scientific agreement among qualified experts, a process based on scientific substantiation of a claim that meets the burden of proof by proposing a possible cause-and-effect mechanism supported by the totality of evidence, leading to agreement among experts. In many countries, scientific consensus established on significant scientific agreement is the basis for regulatory approval of drugs to specify a health claim for the properties of the approved therapeutic agent.

Using climate change as an example, there is significant scientific agreement among climate scientists that humans cause global warming (as of 2011)

Consensus is achieved through scholarly communication at conferences, the publication process, replication of reproducible results by others, debate, and peer review. A conference meant to create a consensus is called a consensus conference. Such measures within a discipline can establish a consensus, although communicating to the lay public that consensus exists may be difficult because the "normal" debates toward gaining consensus may appear to outsiders as revealing uncertainty.

== Scientific substantiation ==
Scientific substantiation for any specific claim is the result of competent and reliable scientific evidence meeting the burden of proof, such as for the confirmed functions of food nutrients on body functions, child growth and development, and reduction of disease risk factors. Such substantiation results from rigorous scientific analysis by the European Food Safety Authority (EFSA) of applications by manufacturers for labeling of marketed food and dietary supplement products, and by Health Canada.

For health claims associated with dietary supplements, the US Food and Drug Administration (FDA) and Federal Trade Commission (FTC) have a "substantiation standard" defined as "tests, analyses, research, studies, or other evidence based on the expertise of professionals in the relevant area, that has been conducted and evaluated in an objective manner by persons qualified to do so, using procedures generally accepted in the profession to yield accurate and reliable results." Supplement labeling requires manufacturers to have substantiation for each claim using a standard consistent with the FTC definition of "competent and reliable scientific evidence". In the European Union, EFSA organizes members of the Scientific Committee, scientific panels and working groups, and external experts to publish scientific opinions on the potential health effects of foods and supplements.

== Significant scientific agreement ==
Significant scientific agreement (SSA) is a high threshold used by international organizations and government agencies where a claim is supported by the totality of the available evidence, giving broad consensus among experts; an example of SSA is the work of climate scientists participating in the Intergovernmental Panel on Climate Change and World Meteorological Organization of the United Nations.

Particularly in food or supplement regulation, SSA is used by the FDA to assess applications by manufacturers wishing to obtain an authorized claim for product labeling. In the United States, claims meeting the SSA standard are called Authorized Health Claims (or "unqualified health claims"), and can be used on product labels without a disclaimer because the evidence supporting them meets SSA. EFSA committees and panels report the results of the collective scientific assessments of foods and supplements for safety and efficacy, with each member having equal input and no one member dominating committee decisions.

== Drug approval process ==
Country by country, the drug approval process, preceded by multiple years of step-wise phases of clinical research, relies on significant scientific agreement, which supports regulatory agencies and drug committee consensus to grant legally-binding approval for marketing of the agent. The strength of scientific consensus based on significant scientific agreement enables regulatory language to describe the approved drug for its specific disease effects, effective doses, side effects, long-term drug safety, and potential interactions with other drugs. Rigorous evaluations derived from scientific consensus are applied in many countries, such as Canada, the European Union, Japan, and United States, among others.

=== Example of vaccine efficacy and safety ===
The Global Advisory Committee on Vaccine Safety of the World Health Organization is an example of multicountry participation in the process of significant scientific agreement to reach scientific consensus on the efficacy and safety of vaccines.

== Position statements ==
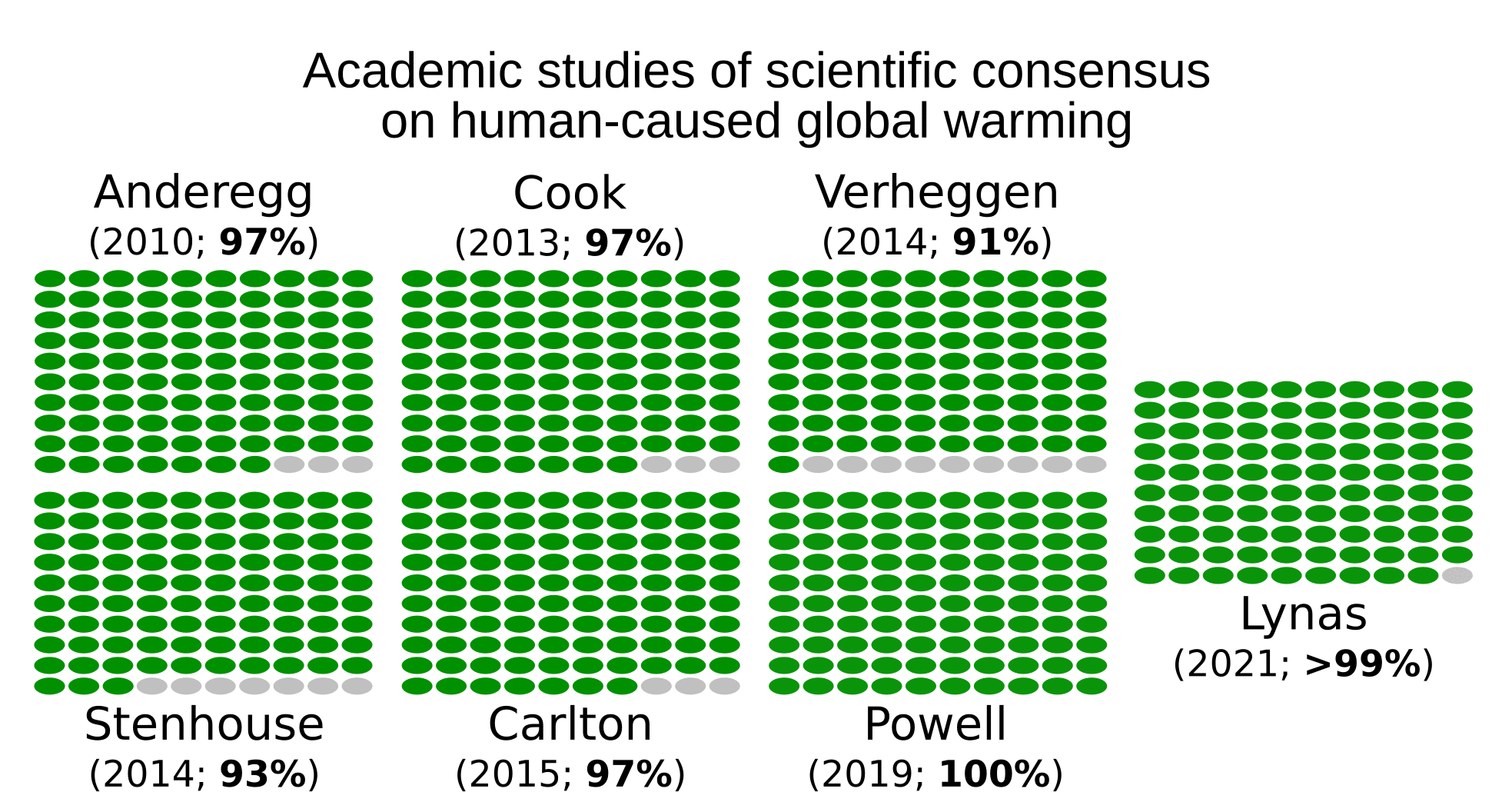
Scientific consensus among publishing climatologists on human-caused global warming (as of 2021)

On occasion, medical organizations or scientific institutes issue position statements, consensus review articles or surveys intended to communicate the science from "inside" the expert source to the "outside" of the scientific community. In cases where there is little controversy regarding the subject under study, such as the human causes of climate change, establishing the consensus is straightforward.

Popular or political debate on subjects that are controversial within the public sphere, but not necessarily controversial within the scientific community, may invoke scientific consensus; such topics include evolution, climate change, the safety of genetically modified organisms, or the lack of causality between MMR vaccinations and autism.

Scientific consensus is related to (and sometimes used to mean) convergent evidence, meaning independent sources of evidence converge on a conclusion.

== Change of consensus over time ==
There are many philosophical and historical theories as to how scientific consensus changes over time. Because the history of scientific change is extremely complicated, and because there is a tendency to project "winners" and "losers" onto the past in relation to the current scientific consensus, it is very difficult to come up with accurate and rigorous models for scientific change. This is made exceedingly difficult also in part because each of the various branches of science functions in somewhat different ways with different forms of evidence and experimental approaches.

Most models of scientific change rely on new data produced by scientific experiment. Karl Popper proposed that since no amount of experiments could ever prove a scientific theory, but a single experiment could disprove one, science should be based on falsification. Whilst this forms a logical theory for science, it is in a sense "timeless" and does not necessarily reflect a view on how science should progress over time.

Among the most influential challengers of this approach was Thomas Kuhn, who argued instead that experimental data always provide some data which cannot fit completely into a theory, and that falsification alone did not result in scientific change or an undermining of scientific consensus. He proposed that scientific consensus worked in the form of "paradigms", which were interconnected theories and underlying assumptions about the nature of the theory itself which connected various researchers in a given field. Kuhn argued that only after the accumulation of many "significant" anomalies would scientific consensus enter a period of "crisis". At this point, new theories would be sought out, and eventually one paradigm would triumph over the old one – a series of paradigm shifts rather than a linear progression towards truth. Kuhn's model also emphasized more clearly the social and personal aspects of theory change, demonstrating through historical examples that scientific consensus was never truly a matter of pure logic or pure facts. However, these periods of 'normal' and 'crisis' science are not mutually exclusive. Research shows that these are different modes of practice, more than different historical periods.

== Perception and public opinion ==
The public substantially underestimates the degree of scientific consensus that humans are causing climate change. Studies from 2019 to 2021 found scientific consensus to range from 98.7 to 100%.

Perception of whether a scientific consensus exists on a given issue, and how strong that conception is, has been described as a "gateway belief" upon which other beliefs and then action are based.

== Politicization of science ==
In public policy debates, the assertion that there exists a consensus of scientists in a particular field is often used as an argument for the validity of a theory. Similarly arguments for a lack of scientific consensus are often used to support doubt about the theory.

For example, the scientific consensus on the causes of global warming is that global surface temperatures have increased in recent decades and that the trend is caused primarily by human-induced emissions of greenhouse gases. The historian of science Naomi Oreskes published an article in Science reporting that a survey of the abstracts of 928 science articles published between 1993 and 2003 showed none which disagreed explicitly with the notion of anthropogenic global warming. In an editorial published in The Washington Post, Oreskes stated that those who opposed these scientific findings are amplifying the normal range of scientific uncertainty about any facts into an appearance that there is a great scientific disagreement, or a lack of scientific consensus. Oreskes's findings were replicated by other methods that require no interpretation.

The theory of evolution through natural selection is also supported by an overwhelming scientific consensus; it is one of the most reliable and empirically tested theories in science. Opponents of evolution claim that there is significant dissent on evolution within the scientific community. The wedge strategy, a plan to promote intelligent design, depended greatly on seeding and building on public perceptions of absence of consensus on evolution.

The inherent uncertainty in science, where theories are never proven but can only be disproven (see falsifiability), poses a problem for politicians, policymakers, lawyers, and business professionals. Where scientific or philosophical questions can often languish in uncertainty for decades within their disciplinary settings, policymakers are faced with the problems of making sound decisions based on the currently available data, even if it is likely not a final form of the "truth". The tricky part is discerning what is close enough to "final truth". For example, social action against smoking probably came too long after science was 'pretty consensual'.

Certain domains, such as the approval of certain technologies for public consumption, can have vast and far-reaching political, economic, and human effects should things run awry with the predictions of scientists. However, insofar as there is an expectation that policy in a given field reflect knowable and pertinent data and well-accepted models of the relationships between observable phenomena, there is little good alternative for policy makers than to rely on so much of what may fairly be called 'the scientific consensus' in guiding policy design and implementation, at least in circumstances where the need for policy intervention is compelling. While science cannot supply 'absolute truth' (or even its complement 'absolute error') its utility is bound up with the capacity to guide policy in the direction of increased public good and away from public harm. Seen in this way, the demand that policy rely only on what is proven to be "scientific truth" would be a prescription for policy paralysis and amount in practice to advocacy of acceptance of all of the quantified and unquantified costs and risks associated with policy inaction.

No part of policy formation on the basis of the ostensible scientific consensus precludes persistent review either of the relevant scientific consensus or the tangible results of policy. Indeed, the same reasons that drove reliance upon the consensus drives the continued evaluation of this reliance over time – and adjusting policy as needed.

== See also ==
- Argument from authority
- Consensus decision-making
- Consensus reality
- Fringe theory
- Medical consensus
- Mertonian norms
- Paradigm
- Scientific consensus on climate change
- Status quaestionis
- Precautionary principle
