= Status quaestionis =

Latin phrase

Status quaestionis, a Latin phrase translated roughly as "the state of investigation," is most commonly employed in scholarly literature to refer in a summary way to the accumulated results, scholarly consensus, and areas remaining to be developed on any given topic. The phrase is often used by ancient historians, classicists, theologians, philosophers, biblical scholars, and scholars in related fields, such as (Christian) church history.
