= Bad News (video game) =

Browser game released in 2018

- Developers: DROG and University of Cambridge
- Designer: Gusmanson
- Platform: Browser
- Release: February 19, 2018

Bad News is a free browser game in which players take the perspective of a fake news tycoon. It was released on February 19, 2018. The game is classified as a serious game and a newsgame aimed at improving media literacy and social impact. The game was produced by the Dutch media platform "DROG" in collaboration with University of Cambridge scientists. The game has been described by the media as a "fake news vaccine".

== Gameplay ==
The purpose of the game is to immunize the public against misinformation by letting players take on the role of a fake news producer. In the game, players earn "badges", each of which correspond to common techniques used in the production of fake news, such as polarization, conspiracy theories, discrediting, trolling, and invoking emotion. The goal is to build your own fake news empire and gain as many followers as possible while maintaining credibility. The game is based on a psychological concept known as inoculation theory, where exposure to weakened doses of common fake news tactics is thought to help confer resistance or psychological immunity against fake news.

== Reception ==
The game received the 2020 Brouwers Trust Prize from the Royal Holland Society of Sciences and the Frank Prize in Public Interest Communications from the University of Florida's College of Journalism.

The game was on exhibit in the London Design Museum for Beazley's Designs of the Year and the University of South Australia's Museum of Discovery and has been the subject of scientific research evaluating its impact on fake news discernment and recognition.

== Localization ==
In 2020, localised versions of the game were released for Eastern European markets where Russian-backed disinformation is of particular concern. Debunk.org published multiple-language versions of the game in Russian, Lithuanian, Latvian, Estonian and Polish.

== See also ==
- Sander van der Linden
