= Hanahaki disease =

Fictional disease caused by unrequited love

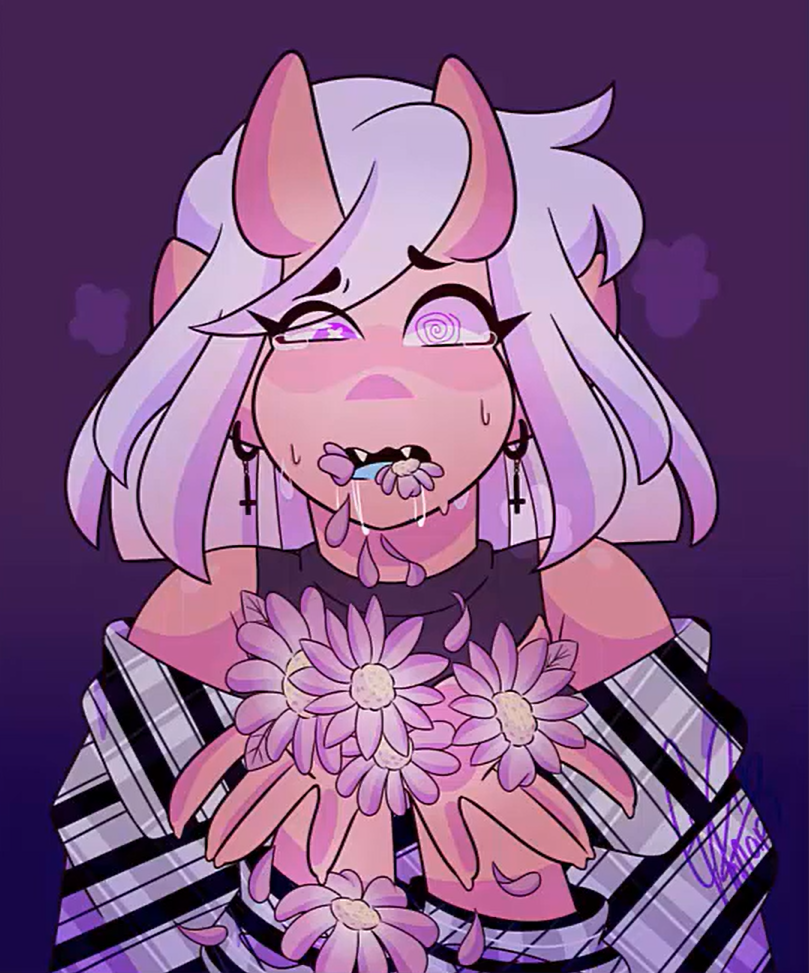
An illustration of a character with Hanahaki disease

Hanahaki disease (Japanese: 花吐き病, Hepburn: Hanahaki-byō; lit. flower-vomiting disease) is a fictional disease characterized by the growth of flowers in the body as a result of unrequited love. This trope originated in shōjo manga and has become a recurring theme in fan labor such as fan fiction, visual arts, poetry, and cosplay.

== Concept and origins ==
The disease manifests as a physical reaction to unrequited love, most often resulting in the growth of flowers within the lungs, heart, or throat of the afflicted character. The primary symptom is coughing or vomiting up flower petals, which progresses into full blooms as the condition worsens. If untreated, the disease is usually portrayed as fatal, with death resulting from suffocation.

In most narratives, Hanahaki disease is portrayed as curable through one of two methods. The first and most common cure is the reciprocation of romantic feelings by the object of the afflicted person's affection. Upon mutual love being established, the flowers disappear, and the symptoms resolve immediately. The second method involves surgical removal of the flowers, which allows the sufferer to survive but at the cost of losing their romantic feelings for the beloved. If neither cure occurs, the disease is typically fatal, progressing until the character suffocates on the flowers. In many depictions, the afflicted character refuses surgery, preferring to die rather than forget their unrequited love.

The term hanahaki is derived from the Japanese words hana (花), meaning flower, and haki (吐き), the infinitive form of haku (吐く), meaning vomiting or throwing up. Hanahaki disease originated in manga, although the precise origins of the trope remain uncertain. Hanahaki disease was popularized by the 2009 Japanese shōjo manga Hanahaki Otome (花吐き乙女) by Naoko Matsuda. Similar concepts are believed to have circulated among East Asian fan communities—particularly in Japan and South Korea—prior to the manga's release, and became a recognizable trope in Western fan circles across numerous fandoms and platforms.

== Popularity and criticism ==
The trope has gained popularity on English-language websites, where it is frequently portrayed in fan fiction, visual arts, poetry, cosplay, and other forms of fan media. Hanahaki disease's widespread adoption in fandom is largely due to its melodramatic potential and visual symbolism. The use of flowers as a motif allows for creative interpretation and personalization across different fandoms and character dynamics.

Hanahaki disease has been closely associated with queer literature, particularly boys' love (BL) romantic pairings. It was already widely popularized in BL manga before gaining traction in Western fan communities. A significant proportion of fan fiction tagged with the trope on platforms such as Archive of Our Own (AO3) involves same-sex relationships; as of 18 September 2023, over 70% of the fan fictions tagged "Hanahaki Disease" on the online fan fiction repository feature gay relationships. In this context, the disease is often interpreted as a manifestation of suppressed or socially unacceptable desire, resonating with historical and cultural anxieties surrounding queer identity.

Hanahaki disease has received critical attention for its thematic implications and narrative structure, particularly in relation to queer representation and emotional dynamics. One source discusses the task of automatically assigning trigger warnings to fan fiction documents that may contain content like Hanahaki disease. Writing for Acta Victoriana, Elisa Penha has expressed concern over how the trope assigns emotional responsibility, reinforces tragic queer narratives, and potentially contributes to fetishistic or pathologizing portrayals of same-sex relationships. She also noted that Hanahaki stories may inadvertently reinforce problematic tropes, including the tragic fate of queer characters or the burdening of emotional responsibility onto the love interest. The surgical removal trope, in particular, has drawn commentary for symbolizing the erasure of personal identity or romantic orientation in exchange for physical survival.

The trope has also been scrutinized for reinforcing the association between queer relationships and tragedy. As Hanahaki stories are often set within male-male romantic pairings, especially in BL manga and Western slash fiction, the frequent depiction of death or emotional erasure as an outcome has been interpreted as a reflection of long standing cultural narratives that deny queer relationships the possibility of happiness. This has been compared to historical storytelling norms, such as those codified by the Hays Code, which mandated tragic fates for queer characters. As such, Hanahaki endings are sometimes viewed as a continuation of a broader media tradition in which queer love is framed as doomed or inherently sorrowful.

== See also ==
- List of fictional diseases
