= Susan Yeagley =

American actress

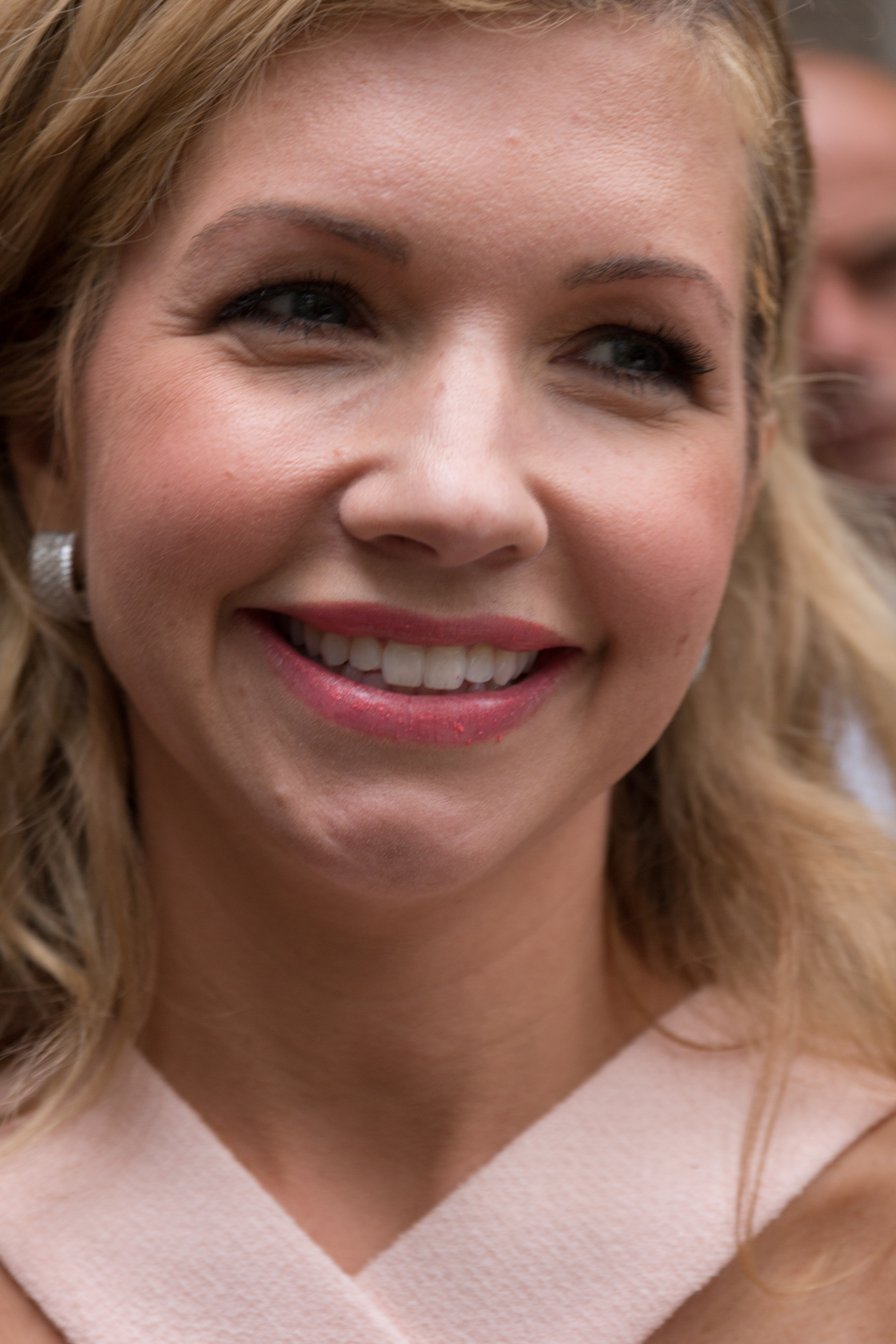
- Yeagley at the 2016 TIFF
- Born: Nashville, Tennessee, U.S.
- Education: University of Southern California (BA)
- Occupation: Actress
- Years active: 1998–present
- Spouse: Kevin Nealon (m. 2005)
- Children: 1

Susan Yeagley is an American actress. She is best known for playing Jessica Wicks in Parks and Recreation (2009–2015).

== Early life and education ==
Yeagley was born in Nashville, Tennessee, and grew up in Hendersonville, Tennessee. She earned a Bachelor of Arts degree from the University of Southern California.

== Career ==
She portrayed Jessica Wicks in nine episodes of the comedy television series Parks and Recreation between 2009 and 2015. She had guest roles on television series ER, Friends, Reno 911!, Curb Your Enthusiasm, Miracles, Everybody Loves Raymond and The Sarah Silverman Program. She also had small roles in Almost Famous, Coyote Ugly, The Thin Pink Line, and others.

== Personal life ==
Yeagley married actor Kevin Nealon on September 3, 2005, in Bellagio, Italy. She gave birth to their first child, a son, in January 2007 in Santa Monica, California.

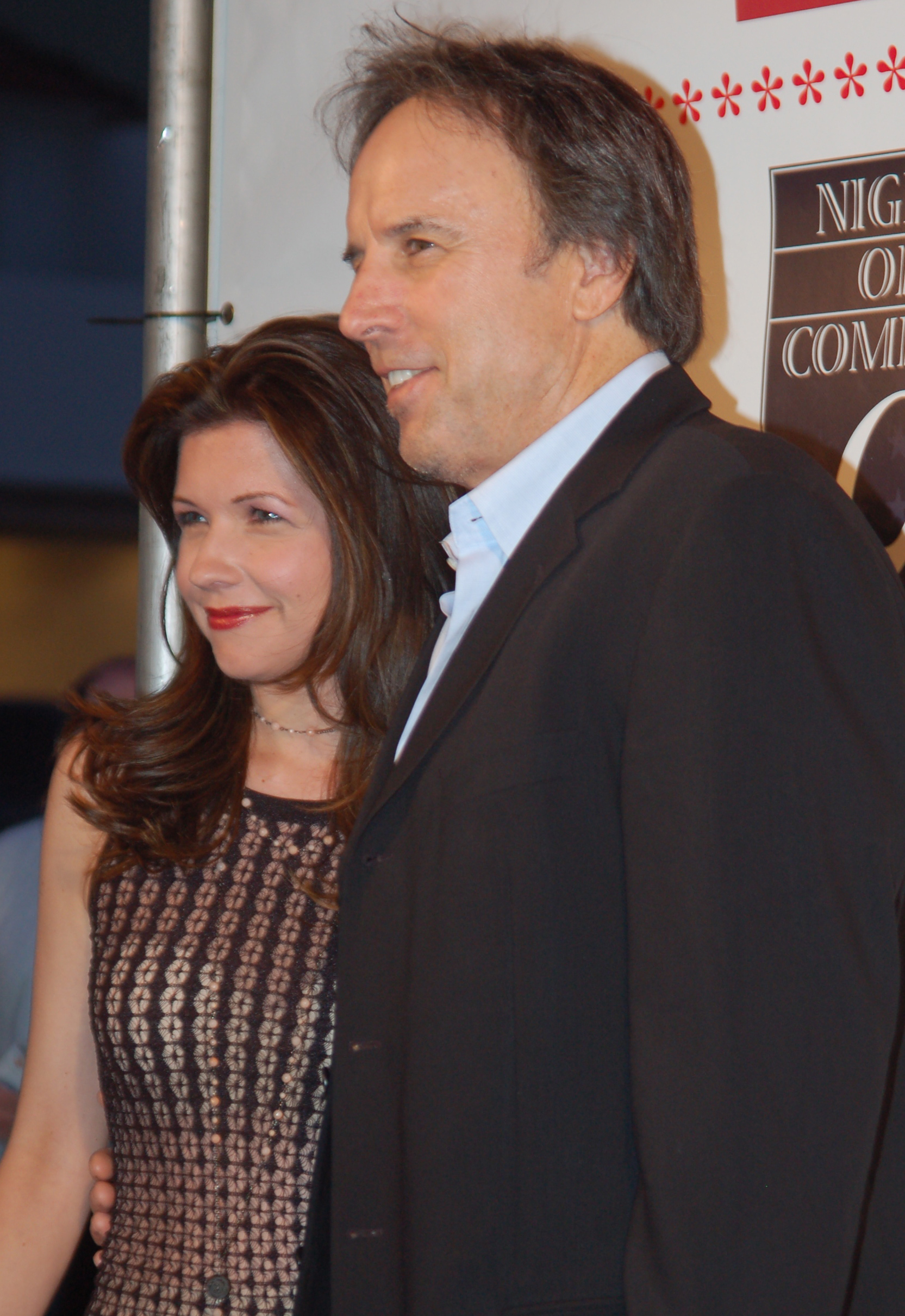
Yeagley with husband Kevin Nealon in 2011

== Filmography ==
=== Film ===
Film roles
Year	Title	Role	Notes
1998	The Thin Pink Line	Chauncey's New Wife	
2000	Coyote Ugly	Bidding Customer	
2000	Almost Famous	Have a Nice Day Stewardess	
2002	Another Bobby O'Hara Story...	Wunda Hair Girl	
2003	Intolerable Cruelty	Tart #1	Uncredited
2005	I'm Not Gay	Jordan	Short film
2006	Fishy	Mom	Short film
2008	The Lucky Ones	Kendra	
2010	Love Shack	Kat Waters	
2011	Balls to the Wall	Wedding Planner	
2011	And They're Off	Molly	
2014	Blended	Southern Stepmom	
2015	Climate Change Denial Disorder	Actor	Short film
2016	Mascots	Laci Babineaux	
2018	Action Point	Adult Boogie Carver	

=== Television ===
Television roles
Year	Title	Role	Notes
1999	Jesse	Student / Girl	2 episodes
2000	Providence	Student #1	Episode: "Mother & Child"
2000	Friends	Amy Woman #1	Episode: "The One with Rachel's Sister"
2000	The Dukes of Hazzard: Hazzard in Hollywood	Tami	Television film
2000	Malcolm in the Middle	Nurse	Episode: "The Bully"
2001	The Ellen Show	The Knockers' Waitress	Episode: "Chain Reaction"
2001	The District	Mrs. J. Crew	Episode: "Night Shift"
2002	Everybody Loves Raymond	Mariann	Episode: "The Cult"
2002	ER	Woman Reporter	Episode: "Walk Like a Man"
2002	The Big Time	Miss Eve #1	Television film
2002	Next!	Various	Episode: "Pilot"
2003	Sabrina, the Teenage Witch	Cinderella	Episode: "You Slay Me"
2003	Reno 911!	Cashier	2 episodes
2003	Miracles	Ginnie	Episode: "Battle at Shadow Ridge"
2004	Significant Others	Steve's Wife	Episode: "Rejection, a Connection & an Erection"
2005	Curb Your Enthusiasm	Stewardess	Episode: "The End"
2006	Campus Ladies	Susan	Episode: "Pilot"
2007–2008	The Sarah Silverman Program	Denise	2 episodes
2008	Easy to Assemble	Blond Lover	Episode: "How Swede It Is"
2009–2010	Til Death	Simona / Simona Redford	9 episodes
2009–2012	Rules of Engagement	Tracy	5 episodes
2009–2015	Parks and Recreation	Jessica Wicks	9 episodes
2010	Svetlana	Cheryl	Episode: "You're Svencome"
2012	Big Time Rush	Lucy's Mom	Episode: "Big Time Double Date"
2012	Brody Stevens: Enjoy It!	Brody's Sitcom Wife	Episode: "I'm Sorry, Chelsea"
2017	The Fake News with Ted Nelms	Lindsay Tuhnite	"Episode #1.1"
2018	Love	Holly	Episode: "Palm Springs Getaway"
2019	Single Parents	Barbara	Episode: "Lance Bass Space Cump"
2020	Mike Tyson Mysteries	Betsy Little	Episode: "The Stein Way"
2021	Sister Swap: A Hometown Holiday	Barb Hutter	Television film
2021	Sister Swap: Christmas in the City	Barb Hutter	Television film
