= Brendan Nyhan =

American political scientist

- Born: 1978 (age 47–48); Mountain View, California, U.S.
- Education: Swarthmore College (BA); Duke University (PhD)
- Occupations: Writer, political scientist
- Employer: Dartmouth College
- Website: www.brendan-nyhan.com

Brendan Nyhan (/ˈnaɪən/; born 1978) is an American political scientist and professor at Dartmouth College. He is also a liberal to moderate political blogger, author, and political columnist. He was born in Mountain View, California and now lives in Hanover, New Hampshire.

== Biography ==
=== Education ===
Nyhan graduated from Mountain View High School in 1996 and later attended Swarthmore College, where he received a Bachelor of Arts in political science in 2000. He graduated from Swarthmore with high honors. In May 2009 Nyhan was awarded a Ph.D. in Political Science from Duke University.

While at Swarthmore, Nyhan and Ben Fritz began the L-Word: Swarthmore's Journal of Progressive Thought. The periodical was launched in May 1997 and their goal was to provide a forum for the diversity of liberal thought which exists at the college. The last issue was in May 1998.

=== Career background ===
In 2000, Nyhan served as the Deputy Communications Director for the failed "Edward M. Bernstein for US Senate campaign" in Nevada.

From 2001 to 2003, Nyhan managed new projects and then marketing and fundraising for Benetech, a Silicon Valley technology nonprofit.

From 2001 to 2004, Nyhan (with Ben Fritz and Bryan Keefer) co-edited Spinsanity, a non-partisan watchdog of political spin that was syndicated in Salon.com in 2002 on-line and The Philadelphia Inquirer in 2004 in print and on the internet. While Spinsanity was active the authors logged over four hundred articles. Spinsanity closed on January 19, 2005.

Nyhan co-authored the non-fiction political book All the President's Spin: George W. Bush, the Media and the Truth in 2004 along with Fritz and Keefer. According to reviewer John Moe the book "detail[s] how Bush and company, more than any administration in history, cherry pick information that they find helpful, regardless of how representative it is of the overall truth, and then package it with a forceful and persistent presentation that eventually takes on the patina of reality."

All the President's Spin reached The New York Times non-fiction paperback bestseller list as #14 in the September 5th edition.

Nyhan has also written for other political and news publications which are on-line such as American Prospect (circa 2002), Time, and others. Since 2014, he has been a contributor to The New York Times blog The Upshot.

In the Fall of 2011, upon completion of his term as a Robert Wood Johnson Scholar in Health Policy Research, Nyhan joined the faculty of Dartmouth College as an assistant professor of government.

In 2018 Nyhan joined the University of Michigan as Professor of Public Policy in the Gerald R. Ford School of Public Policy. After a year at Michigan, Nyhan announced that he would be returning to Dartmouth in the 2019–2020 academic year, citing Dartmouth as a better fit both professionally and personally.

==== Academic research ====
Nyhan's research as a political scientist has focused on the dynamics of scandals, misinformation, persuasion (in the face of misperception), social networks, and statistical methodology.

He has also co-authored studies on the subject of fake news. A 2018 study by Nyhan, Andrew Guess, and Jason Reifler studied "Selective Exposure to Misinformation: Evidence from the consumption of fake news during the 2016 U.S. presidential campaign". After publication, Nyhan was interviewed by NBC News, where he emphatically stated: "People got vastly more misinformation from Donald Trump than they did from fake news websites -- full stop."

NBC NEWS: "It feels like there's a connection between having an active portion of a party that's prone to seeking false stories and conspiracies and a president who has famously spread conspiracies and false claims. In many ways, demographically and ideologically, the president fits the profile of the fake news users that you're describing."

NYHAN: "It's worrisome if fake news websites further weaken the norm against false and misleading information in our politics, which unfortunately has eroded. But it's also important to put the content provided by fake news websites in perspective. People got vastly more misinformation from Donald Trump than they did from fake news websites -- full stop."

== Controversies ==
In late 2006 Nyhan was again tapped to write about "media criticism" for The American Prospect. However, after a few essays/posts he aroused complaint from the editors for his criticism of liberal pundits. According to Nyhan, "Sam Rosenfeld, the magazine's online editor, asked that I focus my blogging on conservative targets." Rosenfeld denied that this was the case. Nyhan, due to his background writing about such topics, (e.g. Spinsanity) refused and decided to terminate his relationship with The American Prospect (aka TAP).

TAP editor Michael Tomasky said that "[t]he Prospect is hardly averse to criticizing liberal verities" ... but "there were a few posts in succession that struck us as either inaccurate or an effort to draw equivalencies where none existed." Tomasky said that Nyhan had made unfounded allegations for reasons of self-promotion, saying: The Prospect has always opposed a 'pox on both houses' posture, and that's what we came to believe [Nyhan was] doing."

== Honors and awards ==
- In 2015, he received the Frank Prize in Public Interest Communications.
- In 2003 he received an "Award of Distinction" from the "Center on Media and Public Affairs", a conservative media watchdog, for debunking National Education Association (NEA)-9/11 reporting.
- In 2004 Amazon.com chose All the President's Spin: George W. Bush, the Media and the Truth as one of the ten best political books of the year.
- Nyhan was selected as a fellow to the 2006–2007 Program for Advanced Research in the Social Sciences (PARISS) at Duke University.
- Nyhan was selected as a Robert Wood Johnson Foundation Scholar in Health Policy Research at the University of Michigan for 2009–2011.

== Books ==
- Nyhan, Brendan, et al. (2004). All the President's Spin: George W. Bush, the Media and the Truth, Touchstone Publishing, New York. ISBN 0-7432-6251-4.

== See also ==
- Backfire effect
