= Frank Karel =

Frank Karel (1935-2009) was an advocate and pioneer in health and public interest communications. Karel focused on philanthropic communications as a way to drive social change.

== Early life and education ==
Frank Karel was born on August 30, 1935, in Orlando, Florida. He served in the Texas Air Force from 1954 to 1958. In 1957 he married the late Graciela Guerrero in San Antonio, Texas. They were married for 44 years until her death in 2001. They had two daughters, Barbara Kendrick and Elizabeth Reynolds. He later married Betsy Karel. He graduated from the University of Florida in 1961 and later received a master's degree in public administration from New York University in 1983. In 1990, he was named an alumnus of distinction by the UF College of Journalism and Communications.

== Career ==
He was a reporter for the Miami Herald and The Tampa Tribune before working in communications. He worked with the National Cancer Institute as the associate director for cancer communication as well as the associate director of public relations for Johns Hopkins University and Johns Hopkins Hospital in Baltimore. He served two terms as the vice president of communications for the Robert Wood Johnson Foundation from 1974 to 1987; and again in 1993-2001. In between his time at RWJF, he worked as vice president of communications for the Rockefeller Foundation. After he retired in 2001 he worked on memoirs and was an advisor to Burness Communications, a nonprofit public relations firm.

== Legacy ==
Karel died at 74 years old on September 19, 2009, after a nine-year battle with prostate cancer in Washington, D.C. His wife, Betsy Karel, and chair to the Trellis Fund, provided a $2.0 million grant to UF creating the nation’s first endowed chair in public interest communications. The Frank Karel Chair in Public Interest Communications was created to field research and practice of public interest communications and strategies. Its goal is to define the field as a tool for advancing organizations’ missions and goals in public and nonprofit sectors. The grant allowed the department of public relations to recruit a practitioner to mentor and direct students who are preparing for careers in public service. The Frank Prize in Public Interest research was established in 2014 by the University of Florida in honor of Frank Karel. The Rockefeller Foundation is also a founding sponsor of The Frank Karel Scholarship at The Communications Network’s annual conference: an event gathering leaders working in philanthropy and nonprofit communications.
