= ECOS (CSIRO magazine) =

ECOS is an Australian environmental magazine which presents articles on sustainability research and issues from across Australia and the Asia Pacific region, published monthly online by CSIRO.

== History and profile ==
ECOS was founded in 1974. The magazine won the Banksia Award for Communication in 2000. Until May June 2011 the magazine was also printed.
