= Frank Prize =

Frank Research Prize
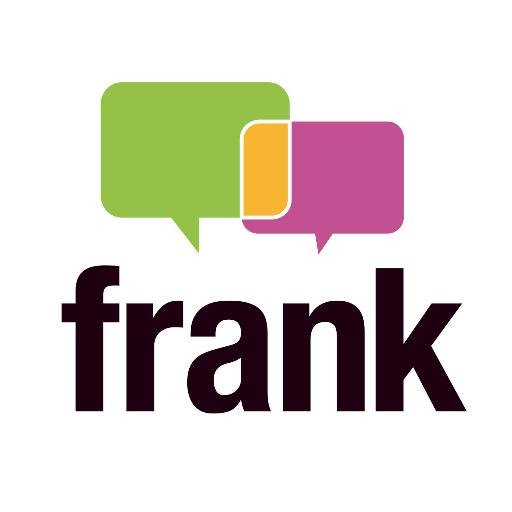
- Awarded for: Outstanding contributions in social change and public interest research
- Country: United States
- Presented by: University of Florida
- Reward: US $10,000
- First award: 2014
- Website: frank.jou.ufl.edu/prize/about-the-prize/

The Frank Prize in Public Interest research was established in 2014 by the University of Florida and named in honor of social change pioneer Frank Karel. The award is given out annually for research that advances public interest communications around positive social change, including issues such as education, health, politics, and the environment. According to the website, the prize "celebrates peer-reviewed research that informs the growing discipline of public interest communications". Eligible disciplines include psychology, neuroscience, public relations, advertising, marketing, journalism, sociology, communications, public health, and political science. After two rounds of independent review by a panel of scholars and practitioners, three awards are made each year with a top financial prize of $10,000. Recipients present their research at the annual Frank Scholar conference organized by the University of Florida. Notable behavioral science scholars such as Paul Slovic and Dan Ariely have presented at the conference.

== Recipients ==
=== 2023 ===
- Dr. Teresa I. Gonzales, Loyola University of Chicago
- Elizabeth M. Thissell, Planned Parenthood Advocates of Virginia
- Soumitra Thorat, King’s College London

=== 2022 ===
- Dr. Jillian Fish, University of Florida
- Payton Counts, University of Florida

=== 2021 ===
- Dr. Allissa V. Richardson, USC Annenberg
- Ryan J. Gallagher, Elizabeth Stowell, Andrea Parker, and Brooke Foucault Welles
- Omar Wasow

=== 2020 ===
- Jon Roozenbeek and Sander van der Linden, University of Cambridge
- Prof. van der Linden and Jon Roozenbeek, University of Florida

=== 2019 ===
- Jeremy Yip, Georgetown University

=== 2018 ===
- Chelsea Schein and Kurt Gray, University of North Carolina, Chapel Hill

=== 2017 ===
- Lisa Fazio, Vanderbilt University

=== 2016 ===
- Troy Campbell, University of Oregon
- Julia Fraustino, West Virginia University
- Jeff Niederdeppe, Cornell University

=== 2015 ===
- Sara Bleich, Johns Hopkins University
- David Sleeth-Keppler, Humboldt State University
- Brendan Nyhan, Dartmouth College

=== 2014 ===
- Jina Yoo, Washington University in St. Louis
- Frank Edwards, University of Washington
- Jennifer Chun, University of Toronto

== See also ==
- List of psychology awards
