= List of climate change controversies =

List of debates over global warming

There are past and present public debates over certain aspects of climate change: how much has occurred in modern times, what causes it, what its effects will be, and what action should be taken to curb it now or later, and so forth. In the scientific literature, there is a very strong consensus that global surface temperatures have increased in recent decades and that the trend is caused by human-induced emissions of greenhouse gases.

The controversies are now primarily political rather than scientific, as there is a scientific consensus that global warming is occurring and is driven by human activities. Public debates that also reflect scientific debate include estimates of how responsive the climate system might be to any given level of greenhouse gases (climate sensitivity). Disputes over the key scientific facts of global warming are more prevalent in the media than in the scientific literature, where such issues are treated as resolved, and such disputes are more prevalent in the United States and Australia than globally.

== Debates around details in the science ==
There have been many debates around the details of climate change science. Climate change deniers and "skeptics" tend to cherry-pick data or studies, and then trump up any scientific discussions or apparent discrepancies that match with their agenda. Many of those apparent discrepancies have been reconciled in the meantime, climate models have become more accurate, the scientific consensus on climate change has strengthened and so forth. For example, climatologist Kevin E. Trenberth has published widely on the topic of climate variability and has exposed flaws in the publications of other scientists.

For past debates and controversies on scientific details see for example:

- History of climate change science § Discredited theories and reconciled apparent discrepancies
- Climate change denial § Discussing specific aspects of climate change science
- Intergovernmental Panel on Climate Change § Challenges and controversies (the IPCC assessment reports, like the most recent IPCC Sixth Assessment Report summarise the state of the art of climate science at the time).

== Debates over most effective response to warming ==
There have been debates on the best responses to slow global warming, and their timing. The debates are around the specific actions for climate change mitigation and climate change adaptation, or climate action in general. See for example:

- Economic analysis of climate change
- Climate change denial § Delaying climate change mitigation measures
- Climate change denial § Pushing for adaptation only
- Climate action (Climate crisis)

== See also ==
- Attitude polarization
- History of climate change policy and politics
- Manufactured controversy
- Politicization of science
- Right-wing antiscience
