= Gateway belief model =

The gateway belief model (GBM) suggests that public perception of the degree of expert or scientific consensus on an issue functions as a so-called "gateway" cognition. Perception of scientific agreement is suggested to be a key step towards acceptance of related beliefs. Increasing the perception that there is normative agreement within the scientific community can increase individual support for an issue. A perception of disagreement may decrease support for an issue.

Public opinion research has shown a "consensus gap" between the beliefs of the general public and the scientific community on a number of issues including climate change, vaccines, evolution, gun control, and GMOs. The general public is assumed to underestimate the degree of agreement among scientists on established facts relating to these issues.

According to the gateway belief model, views can be influenced by presenting information about the scientific consensus on a subject. Communicating accurate information about the scientific consensus on a topic reduces perceptions that there is disagreement within the scientific community. Some studies show a causal connection between changes in perceived consensus and subsequent attitudes on issues. In the case of climate change, perceptions of expert agreement are considered a precursor to related beliefs about whether and why climate change is happening. In the case of COVID-19, perception of scientific consensus predicted personal attitudes and support for mitigation policies.

The gateway belief model also implies that organized disinformation campaigns may be able to deliberately undermine public support for an issue by suggesting a lack of scientific consensus or amplifying opinions that disagree with the scientific consensus. Undermining scientific consensus is therefore a frequent disinformation tactic.

== History ==
=== Theoretical background ===
The gateway belief model is a dual process theory in psychology and the communication sciences. Specifically, the GBM postulates a two-step process of opinion change, where (mis)perceptions of normative agreement influence "key" personal beliefs that people hold about an issue (step 1), which in turn, shape public attitudes and support (step 2). Although the basic process of debiasing judgment can be viewed as a form of knowledge deficit, development of the gateway belief model is based on research in cognitive and social psychology, mainly drawing on theories of heuristic information-processing, social norms, decision-making, and motivated cognition.

=== Consensus-heuristic ===
In the face of uncertainty, people often look to others for guidance, including experts. Prior research shows that people heuristically rely on consensus cues in the absence of motivation to cognitively elaborate, because consensus typically implies correctness. Research also indicates that people desire to conform to the expert consensus and generally prefer to rely on the combined judgment of multiple experts rather than on individual expert opinions. Relying on consensus cues is often considered socially adaptive because it harnesses the wisdom of the crowd effect. Consensus is therefore an example of a descriptive norm, i.e., the collective judgment of a group of individuals, such as experts.

Public opinion research shows that the views of the general public often diverge sharply from experts on a number of important societal issues, especially in the United States. This is known as the "consensus gap". The main premise of the gateway belief model is that this gap can be reduced by highlighting or communicating the actual degree of social or scientific consensus on an issue.

== Norm perception as a vehicle for social change ==
The basic mechanism of the gateway belief model involves realigning people's (mis)perception of the degree of group consensus with the factual degree of consensus. This parallels research in social psychology on leveraging norm-perception as a vehicle for social change.

For example, early research showed that college students frequently misperceive the social consensus on campus binge drinking. Through a method known as "estimate and reveal", social psychologists have attempted to reveal the discrepancy between students' subjective perceptions of the drinking norm among their peers and the actual norm (which is typically much lower). Social norm communication campaigns indeed evidence that increasing awareness of the actual drinking norm has positive subsequent impacts on students' own attitudes and behavior towards binge drinking.

While excessive binge drinking is often harmful to the individual, large-scale societal misperceptions of scientific agreement on social dilemmas such as climate change or vaccines can be collectively harmful. When the consensus intervention involves experts rather than peers, the social influence process is referred to as obedience.

== Role of misinformation ==
The "sticky" nature of myths and the spread of misinformation is often cited as a major cause of public confusion over the nature of scientific consensus. Prominent examples include autism-vaccine controversies, the causal link between smoking and lung cancer and the role of carbon dioxide emissions in driving global warming.

People's perception of expert consensus has generally shown to be sensitive to anecdotal evidence and misinformation. Vested-interest groups, sometimes referred to as "merchants of doubt", deliberately try to undermine public understanding of the scientific consensus on these topics through organized disinformation campaigns.

== Related concepts ==
Other related concepts include the false-consensus effect and pluralistic ignorance.

== Other theories ==
The "cultural cognition of scientific consensus" thesis advocated by Dan Kahan stands in contrast to the gateway belief model (GBM) but has not been supported by empirical results. The cultural cognition thesis suggests that people will credit or dismiss empirical evidence based on whether it coheres or conflicts with their cultural or political values, a process known as "identity-protective cognition". Because people are committed to the types of beliefs that define their everyday socio-political relations, the cultural cognition thesis predicts that exposing people to consensus information on contested issues will therefore increase attitude polarization.

The empirical results of the gateway belief model contradict the prediction of the "cultural cognition of scientific consensus". Notably, an emphasis on scientific consensus does not backfire, and can reduce or neutralize belief polarization between (political) groups. Related research has also shown that conveying scientific agreement can reduce directional motivated reasoning, although other research on this topic has revealed more mixed results.

One explanation for these findings is that changing beliefs about what other groups think (so-called "meta-beliefs") does not require a full and immediate adjustment of one's own worldview. Perceived consensus can therefore be seen as a "non-identity threatening" cognition, especially when a norm is described among a neutral out-group (scientists). Kahan has a notable on-going scholarly debate in the literature with van der Linden and Lewandowsky on the role of perceived consensus and cultural cognition.
