= List of fictional diseases and disorders =

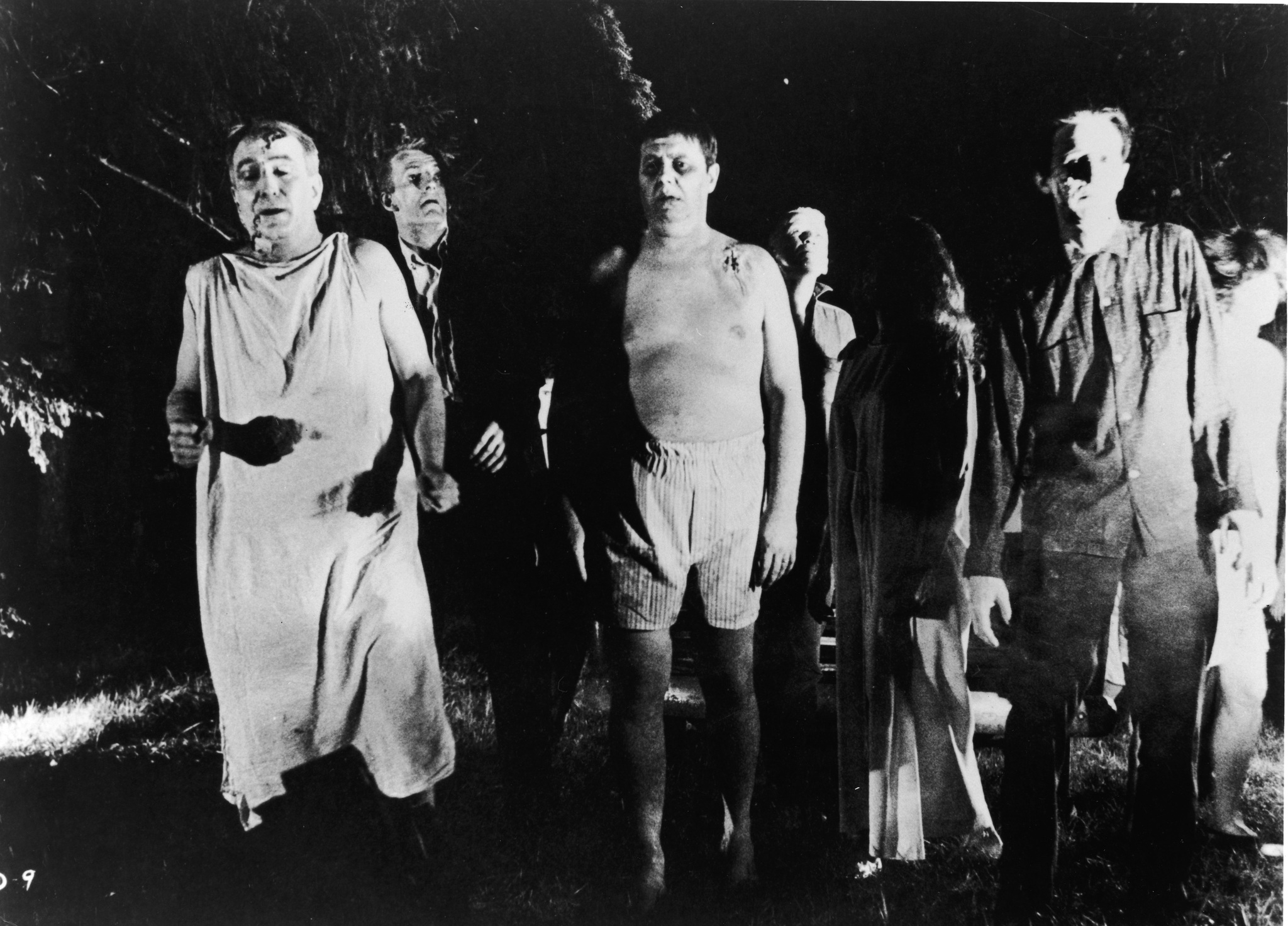
Zombification is a fictional disease which turns humans into mindless cannibals known as zombies.

Diseases, disorders, infections, and pathogens have appeared in fiction as part of a major plot or thematic importance.

== In multiple media ==
Name	Source	Description	Ref.
Cooties	Children's games	Cooties was a common term to refer to head lice. In the United States children use the term to refer to an invisible germ, bug, or microscopic monster, transferred by skin-to-skin contact, usually by a member of the opposite sex.	
Hanahaki disease	Fan fiction and fan art	A fictional illness in which a person suffering from unrequited or suppressed love begins to cough up flower petals, with the condition worsening the longer the love remains unreturned.	
Ligma	Internet memes and jokes	An ambiguous fictional disease described as fatal. The term is used as a set up to a joke due to its phonetic similarity to the words "lick my", with the punchline being "ligma balls", "ligma dick", or other variations.	
Lycanthropy	Various	A contagious curse or disease which transforms people into mutant human-wolf hybrid monsters known as werewolves. In many stories, werewolves can infect and turn other people into werewolves through bites and scratches.	
Vampirism	Various	A contagious curse or disease which transforms people into (usually undead) monsters known as vampires, which feed on the blood of normal humans and other living creatures. In many stories, vampires can infect and turn other people into vampires, usually through bite wounds or by injecting vampire blood into their body.	
Zombification	Various	A contagious curse or disease which transforms people into (usually undead) monsters known as zombies, which feed on the flesh of normal humans and other living creatures. In many stories, zombies can infect and turn other people into zombies by biting them.	

== In particular media ==
Name	Source	Description	Ref.
The Black Breath	J. R. R. Tolkien's Middle-earth	An affliction contracted by "excessive proximity" to a Nazgûl, seems to be a "spiritual malady" combined with "fear, confusion, reduced levels of consciousness, hypothermia, weakness and death".	
Corrupted blood	World of Warcraft	Initially contracted from fighting Hakkar, the god of blood, in the dungeon of Zul'Gurub. Highly infectious, with an incubation period of two seconds and can infect any person in the immediate area.	
Las plagas	Resident Evil series	A parasitic organism which can infect a variety of hosts, including humans. It has the ability to control its host's behavior, inducing a hive-like mentality among the infected and extreme hostility towards uninfected individuals. The infected retain most of the characteristics of humans such as fine motor skills as seen through their use of simple weapons such as scythes and axes, and more complicated weapons such as chainsaws and chainguns. They are seen to obey queen parasites, much like ants.	
Legacy Virus	Marvel Comics	A disease that targets only mutants, causing genetic and biological degradation and eventual death; shortly before death, the virus' effects cause a violent, uncontrolled flare-up of the victim's superhuman abilities.	
The phage	Star Trek: Voyager	A necrotizing plague that affects members of the Vidiian species. Organ transplants are required for survival.	
The Red Death	"The Masque of the Red Death" by Edgar Allan Poe	A disease resembling an epidemic plague. Represents death's inevitability, even to the rich who try to avoid it.	
Techno-organic virus	Marvel Comics	A virus that transforms living tissue into techno-organic material, which resembles both machinery and living tissue.	
