= Environmental activism of Al Gore =

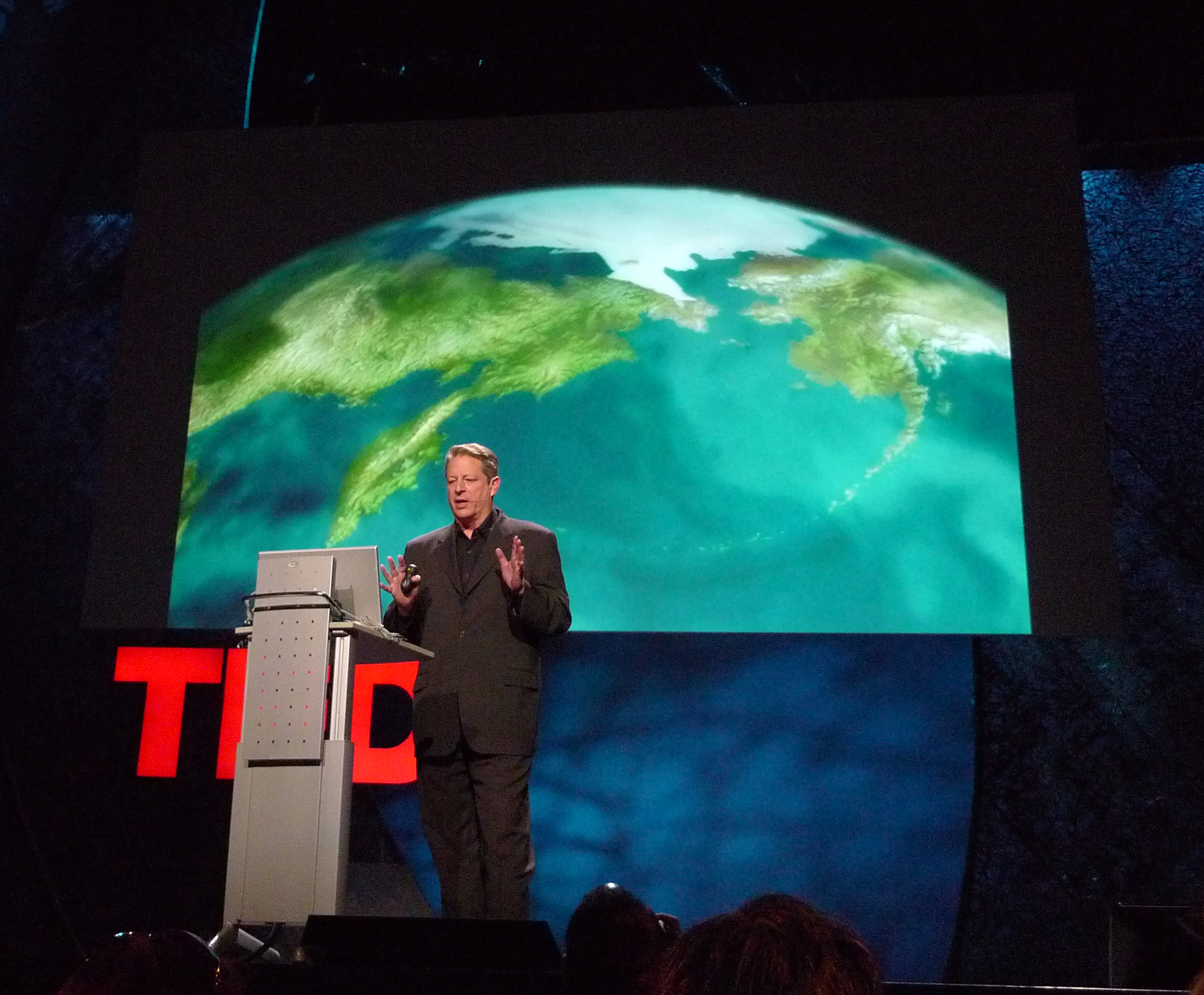
Al Gore delivering a speech on environmental issues at TED in 2009

Al Gore is an American politician and environmentalist. He was vice president of the United States from 1993 to 2001, the Democratic Party's presidential nominee in 2000, and the co-recipient of the 2007 Nobel Peace Prize with the Intergovernmental Panel on Climate Change.

He has been involved with the environmental activist movement for a number of decades and has had full participation since he left the vice-presidency in 2001. His most famous effort since then was the 2006 documentary An Inconvenient Truth, where he warns for the consequences of human-induced climate change for mankind.

== Childhood ==
Gore stated in an interview for The New York Times that his interest in environmentalism began when he was a teenager:

As I was entering high school, my mother was reading Silent Spring and the dinner table conversation was about pesticides and the environment ... The year I graduated from college the momentum was building for Earth Day. After that, as I was entering divinity school, the Club of Rome report came out and the limits to growth was a main issue.

== Politics ==
=== Congress ===
Gore has been involved with environmental work for a number of decades. In 1976, at 28, after joining the United States House of Representatives, Gore held the "first congressional hearings on the climate change, and co-sponsor[ed] hearings on toxic waste and global warming". He continued to speak on the topic throughout the 1980s and was known as one of the Atari Democrats, later called the "Democrats' Greens, politicians who see issues like clean air, clean water and global warming as the key to future victories for their party".

In 1989, while still a Senator, Gore published an editorial in The Washington Post, in which he argued:

Humankind has suddenly entered into a brand new relationship with the planet Earth. The world's forests are being destroyed; an enormous hole is opening in the ozone layer. Living species are dying at an unprecedented rate.

In 1990, Senator Gore presided over a three-day conference with legislators from over 42 countries which sought to create a Global Marshall Plan, "under which industrial nations would help less developed countries grow economically while still protecting the environment".

The Concord Monitor says that Gore "was one of the first politicians to grasp the seriousness of climate change and to call for a reduction in emissions of carbon dioxide and other greenhouse gases".

=== Vice presidency: 1993–2001 ===
As Vice President, Gore was involved in a number of initiatives related to the environment. He launched the GLOBE program on Earth Day 1994, an education and science activity that, according to Forbes, "made extensive use of the Internet to increase student awareness of their environment". In the late 1990s, Gore strongly pushed for the passage of the Kyoto Protocol, which called for reduction in greenhouse gas emissions. He was opposed by the Senate, which passed unanimously (95–0) the Byrd–Hagel Resolution (S. Res. 98), which stated the sense of the Senate was that the United States should not be a signatory to any protocol that did not include binding targets and timetables for developing as well as industrialized nations or "would result in serious harm to the economy of the United States". On November 12, 1998, Gore symbolically signed the protocol. Both Gore and Senator Joseph Lieberman indicated that the protocol would not be acted upon in the Senate until there was participation by the developing nations. The Clinton Administration never submitted the protocol to the Senate for ratification. In 1998, Gore became associated with Digital Earth. He also began promoting a NASA satellite that would provide a constant view of Earth, marking the first time such an image would have been made since The Blue Marble photo from the 1972 Apollo 17 mission. The "Triana" satellite would have been permanently mounted in the L_{1} Lagrangian Point, 1.5 million km away. This satellite would allow the measurement of the earth's changing reflectivity (albedo) due to melting ice caps, but the project was put on hold by George W. Bush's administration. The satellite was finally launched in 2015 as the Deep Space Climate Observatory.

== 2001–present ==
=== Generation Investment Management ===
In 2004, Gore co-launched Generation Investment Management, a company for which he serves as Chair. The company was "a new London fund management firm that plans to create environment-friendly portfolios. Generation Investment will manage assets of institutional investors, such as pension funds, foundations and endowments, as well as those of 'high net worth individuals,' from offices in London and Washington, D.C." The fund's filed accounts showed profits in 2017 of £248.5m, with assets of £14.2bn. Turnover at the London-based operation was £293m with distributed profits of £193m to the firm's 32 members, one of the senior staff receiving £41m (The Sunday Times (UK), September 16, 2018).

=== We Can Solve It ===
Gore and The Alliance for Climate Protection created the We Can Solve It organization, a web-based program with multiple advertisements on television focused on spreading awareness for climate crisis (global warming) and petitioning for the press putting more attention on the crisis, the government doing more to help the environment, and their ultimate goal is the end to global warming. Although focused mostly upon the United States, and Americans, it is an international petition and effort. It already has over one million signatures.

=== Lectures and conferences ===
In recent years, Gore has remained busy traveling the world speaking and participating in events mainly aimed towards global warming awareness and prevention. His keynote presentation on global warming has received standing ovations, and he has presented it at least 1,000 times according to his monologue in An Inconvenient Truth. His speaking fee is $100,000. Gore's global warming presentations in several major cities have sometimes been associated with exceptionally severe cold weather, a juxtaposition since dubbed "the Gore Effect." Gore is a vocal proponent of carbon neutrality, buying a carbon offset each time he travels by aircraft. Gore and his family drive hybrid vehicles. In An Inconvenient Truth Gore calls for people to conserve energy.

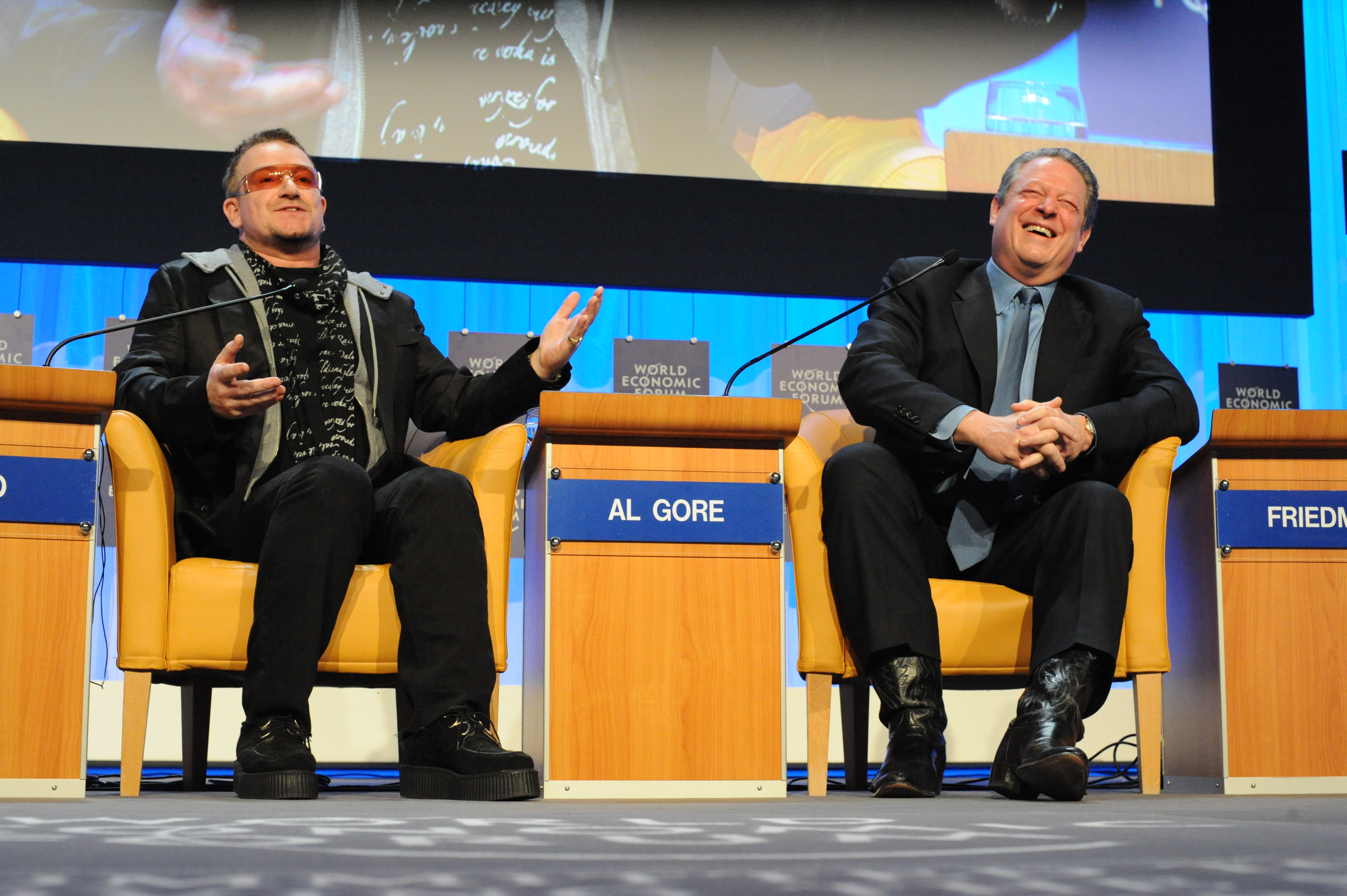
Bono and Al Gore at The World Economic Forum, 2008

In 2007, Al Gore was the main non-official representative for the United States in the United Nations Climate Change Conference in Bali, which is a series of discussions that plans to continue where the Kyoto Protocol left off when it expires in 2012. He used a famous World War II poem written by Pastor Martin Niemöller to describe how the international community is eerily accomplishing nothing in the face of the greatest crisis in human history. He ended the speech using his famous tag line: "However, political will is a renewable resource."

During Global Warming Awareness Month, on February 9, 2007, Al Gore and Richard Branson announced the Virgin Earth Challenge, a competition offering a $25 million prize for the first person or organization to produce a viable design that results in the removal of atmospheric greenhouse gases.

A public lecture at University of Toronto on February 21, 2007, on the topic of global warming, led to a crash of the ticket sales website within minutes of opening.

In March 2008, Gore gave a talk via videoconferencing in order to promote this technology as a means, he argued, of fighting global warming.

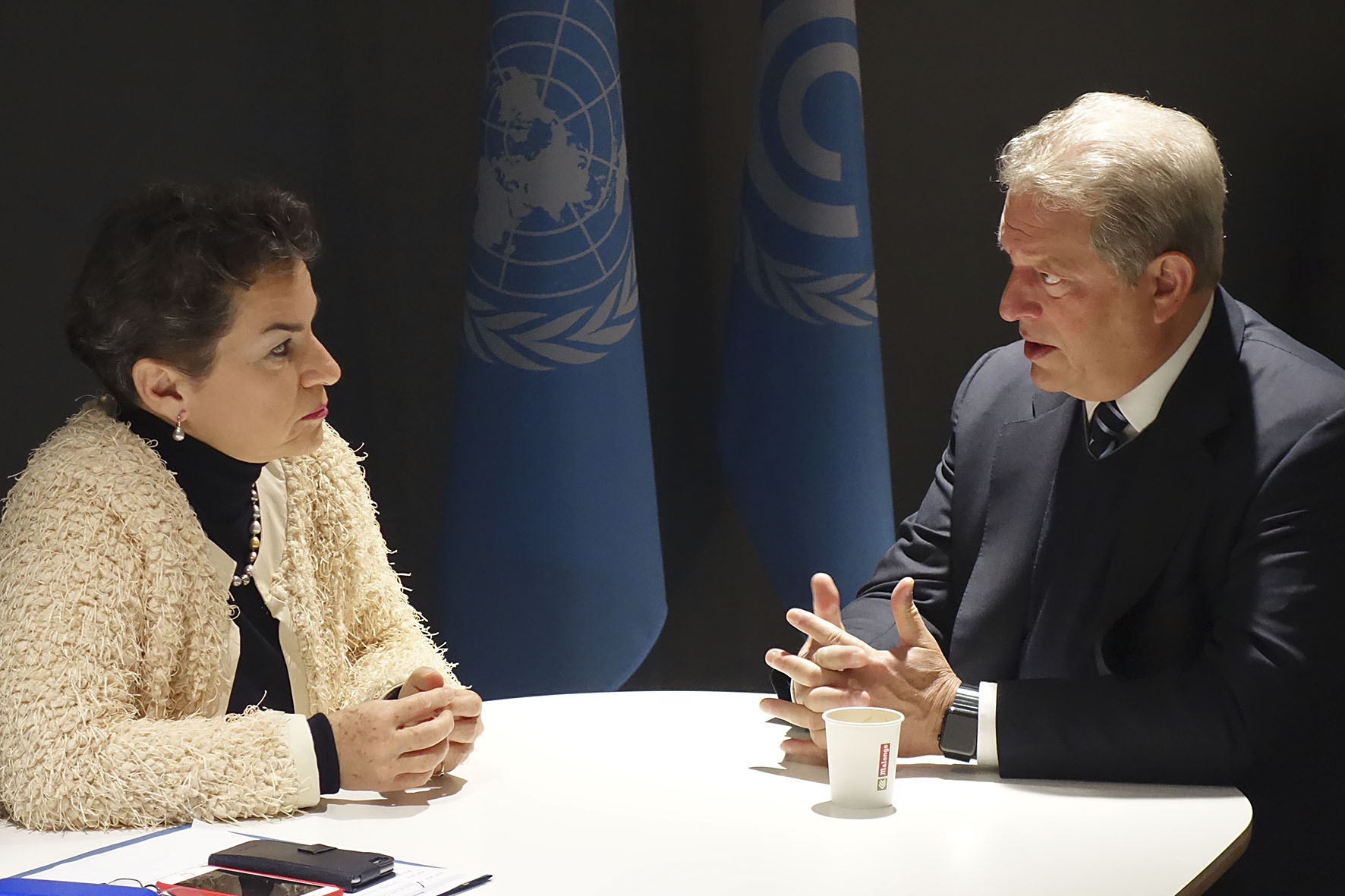
Gore and Christiana Figueres at the 2015 United Nations Climate Change Conference.

On July 17, 2008, Gore gave a speech at the DAR Constitution Hall in Washington, D.C. in which he called for a move towards replacing a dependence upon "carbon-based fuels" with Green energy by the United States within the next ten years. Gore stated: "When President John F. Kennedy challenged our nation to land a man on the moon and bring him back safely in 10 years, many people doubted we could accomplish that goal. But 8 years and 2 months later, Neil Armstrong and Buzz Aldrin walked on the surface of the moon." Some criticized his plan. According to the BBC, "Robby Diamond, president of a bipartisan think tank called Securing America's Future Energy, said weaning the nation off fossil fuels could not be done in a decade. 'The country is not going to be able to go cold turkey ... We have a hundred years of infrastructure with trillions of dollars of investment that is not simply going to be made obsolete.'"

=== Repower America ===
On July 21, 2008, Al Gore used a speech to challenge the United States to commit to producing all electricity from renewable sources (AERS) like solar and wind power in 10 years . Al Gore´s Alliance for Climate Protection In this speech, Al Gore says that our dangerous over-reliance on carbon-based fuels is at the core of all three of the economic, environmental and national security crises. Our democracy has become sclerotic at a time when these crises require bold policy solutions.

Center for Resource Solutions supports Al Gore's Repower America goal.

=== Civil disobedience to stop coal plants ===
On September 24, 2008, Gore made the following statements in a speech given at the Clinton Global Initiative:

"If you're a young person looking at the future of this planet and looking at what is being done right now, and not done, I believe we have reached the stage where it is time for civil disobedience to prevent the construction of new coal plants that do not have carbon capture and sequestration."

These remarks were similar to ones he'd made the previous year:

"I can't understand why there aren't rings of young people blocking bulldozers," Mr. Gore said, "and preventing them from constructing coal-fired power plants."

=== Climate Reality Project ===
In March 2010 two nonprofit organizations founded by Al Gore, the Alliance for Climate Protection and the Climate Project, joined together, and in July 2011 the combined organization was renamed the Climate Reality Project. In February 2012 the Climate Reality Project organized an expedition to the Antarctic with "civic and business leaders, activists and concerned citizens from many countries".

=== Vegan ===
In 2013, Gore became a vegan. He had earlier said that "it's absolutely correct that the growing meat intensity of diets across the world is one of the issues connected to this global crisis -- not only because of the [carbon dioxide] involved, but also because of the water consumed in the process" and some speculate that his adoption of the new diet is related to his environmentalist stance. In a 2014 interview, Gore said "Over a year ago I changed my diet to a vegan diet, really just to experiment to see what it was like. ... I felt better, so I've continued with it and I'm likely to continue it for the rest of my life."

=== Rampal power plant ===
In a plenary session of the 47th annual meeting of the World Economic Forum (WEF) in Davos of Switzerland on January 18, 2017, Al Gore urged Prime Minister of Bangladesh Sheikh Hasina to stop building the coal-powered Rampal Power Station close to the largest mangrove forest, Sundarbans.

=== Climate and Health Summit ===
A "Climate and Health Summit" which was originally going to be held by the Centers for Disease Control and Prevention, was cancelled without warning in late January 2017. A few days later, Gore revived the summit, which he will hold without the CDC.

=== Environmental criticism ===
Four main environmental criticisms have been leveled at Gore: (1) he has an alleged conflict of interest from his role as both an investor in green-technology companies and as an advocate of taxpayer-funded green-technology subsidies, (2) he allegedly makes erroneous scientific claims, (3) he consumes excessive amounts of energy, and (4) he allegedly refuses to debate others on the subject of global warming.

In reference to Gore's alleged conflict of interest, some critics have labeled Gore a "carbon billionaire." In response to these criticisms Gore stated that it is "certainly not true" that he is a "carbon billionaire" and that he is "proud to put my money where my mouth is for the past 30 years. And though that is not the majority of my business activities, I absolutely believe in investing in accordance with my beliefs and my values." Gore was challenged on this topic by Tennessee Congresswoman Marsha Blackburn who asked him: "The legislation that we are discussing here today, is that something that you are going to personally benefit from?" Gore responded by stating: "I believe that the transition to a green economy is good for our economy and good for all of us, and I have invested in it." Gore also added that all earnings from his investments have gone to the Alliance for Climate Protection and that "If you believe that the reason I have been working on this issue for 30 years is because of greed, you don't know me." Finally, Gore told Blackburn: "Do you think there is something wrong with being active in business in this country ... I am proud of it. I am proud of it."

Criticisms of Gore's allegedly erroneous scientific statements tend to focus on a British High Court's ruling that Gore's Inconvenient Truth documentary was deemed by the court to have nine significant errors. Several of these, such as the statement that climate change was a main cause of coral reef bleaching, and that polar bears were drowning due to habitat-loss as a result of ice-cap melting, have been subsequently backed up by stronger evidence than the court was able to locate at the time. The court's broad conclusion, nevertheless, was that "many of the claims made by the film were fully backed up by the weight of science."

Gore has also been the subject of criticism for his personal use of energy, including his ownership of multiple large homes. The Tennessee Center for Policy Research (TCPR) has twice criticized Gore for electricity consumption in his Tennessee home. In February 2007, TCPR stated that its analysis of records from the Nashville Electric Service indicated that the Gore household uses "20 times as much electricity as the average household nationwide." In reporting on TCPR's claims, MSNBC's Countdown With Keith Olbermann noted that the house has twenty rooms and home offices and that the "green power switch" installed increased their electric bill while decreasing overall carbon pollution. Philosopher A. C. Grayling also defended Al Gore, arguing that Gore's personal lifestyle does nothing to impugn his message and that Gore's critics have committed the ad hominem fallacy.

A few months later, the Associated Press reported on December 13, 2007, that Gore "has completed a host of improvements to make the home more energy efficient, and a building-industry group has praised the house as one of the nation's most environmentally friendly ... 'Short of tearing it down and starting anew, I don't know how it could have been rated any higher,' said Kim Shinn of the non-profit U.S. Green Building Council, which gave the house its second-highest rating for sustainable design."

Gore was criticized by the TCPR again in June 2008, after the group obtained his public utility bills from the Nashville Electric Service and compared "electricity consumption between the 12 months before June 2007, when it says he installed his new technology, and the year since then." According to their analysis, the Gores consumed 10% more energy in the year since their home received its eco-friendly modifications. TCPR also argued that, while the "average American household consumes 11,040 kWh in an entire year," the Gore residence "uses an average of 17,768 kWh per month –1,638 kWh more energy per month than before the renovations." Gore's spokeswoman Kalee Kreider countered the claim by stating that the Gores' "utility bills have gone down 40 percent since the green retrofit." and that "the three-year renovation on the home wasn't complete until November, so it's a bit early to attempt a before-and-after comparison." She also noted that TCPR did not include Gore's gas bill in their analysis (which they had done the previous year) and that the gas "bill has gone down 90 percent ... And when the Gores do power up, they pay for renewable resources, like wind and solar power or methane gas." Media Matters for America also discussed the fact that "100 percent of the electricity in his home comes from green power" and quoted the Tennessee Valley Authority as stating that "[a]lthough no source of energy is impact-free, renewable resources create less waste and pollution."

In August 2017, it was reported that over the past year, Gore used enough electric energy to power the typical American household for over 21 years, as per a report issued by the National Center for Public Policy Research. Reportedly, Gore consumed 230,889 kilowatt hours (kWh) at his Nashville residence alone. Additionally, Gore owns two other residences – a penthouse in San Francisco and a farmhouse in Carthage, Tennessee – making his carbon footprint even larger than what was reported. Gore's Nashville home actually classifies as an 'energy hog' under standards developed by Energy Vanguard.

Some have argued that Gore refuses to debate the topic of global warming. Bjørn Lomborg, a key figure in the climate-change denier movement, asked him to debate the topic at a conference in California. Gore replied that he would not, stating that "The scientific community has gone through this chapter and verse. We have long since passed the time when we should pretend this is a 'on the one hand, on the other hand' issue," he said. "It's not a matter of theory or conjecture, for goodness sake."

== Books, film, television, and live performances ==
=== An Inconvenient Truth ===
Gore starred in the documentary film An Inconvenient Truth, released on May 24, 2006. The film documents the evidence for anthropogenic global warming and warns of the consequences of people not making immediate changes to their behavior. It is the fourth-highest-grossing documentary in U.S. history.

After An Inconvenient Truth was nominated for an Academy Award, Donna Brazile (Gore's campaign chairwoman from the 2000 campaign) speculated that Gore might announce a possible presidential candidacy for the 2008 election. During a speech on January 31, 2007, at Moravian College, Brazile stated, "Wait till Oscar night, I tell people: 'I'm dating. I haven't fallen in love yet. On Oscar night, if Al Gore has slimmed down 25 or 30 pounds, Lord knows.'" During the award ceremony, Gore and actor Leonardo DiCaprio shared the stage to speak about the "greening" of the ceremony itself. Gore began to give a speech that appeared to be leading up to an announcement that he would run for president. However, background music drowned him out and he was escorted offstage, implying that it was a rehearsed gag, which he later acknowledged.

After winning the 2007 Academy Award for Documentary Feature. the Oscar was awarded to director Davis Guggenheim, who asked Gore to join him and other members of the crew on stage. Gore then gave a brief speech, saying, "My fellow Americans, people all over the world, we need to solve the climate crisis. It's not a political issue; it's a moral issue. We have everything we need to get started, with the possible exception of the will to act. That's a renewable resource. Let's renew it."

The official documentary film website is meaningfully called climatecrisis.net

At the 2017 Sundance Film Festival, Gore released An Inconvenient Sequel: Truth to Power, a sequel to his 2006 film, An Inconvenient Truth, which documents his continuing efforts to battle climate change.

=== Books ===
Gore wrote Earth in the Balance (which was published in 1992) while his six-year-old son Albert was recovering from a serious accident. It became the first book written by a sitting Senator to make The New York Times Best Seller list since John F. Kennedy's Profiles in Courage.

Gore also published the book An Inconvenient Truth: The Planetary Emergency of Global Warming and What We Can Do About It, which became a bestseller. In reference to the use of nuclear power to mitigate global warming, Gore has stated, "Nuclear energy is not the panacea for tackling global warming."

In July 2017, Gore published An Inconvenient Sequel: Truth to Power: Your Action Handbook to Learn the Science, Find Your Voice, and Help Solve the Climate Crisis, concurrent with his film An Inconvenient Sequel: Truth to Power.

=== Futurama ===
Gore's head in a jar as depicted in the Futurama episode "Crimes of the Hot".

Gore appeared in Matt Groening's Futurama as himself and his own head in a jar in episodes related to environmentalism. Gore also reprised the role in the 2007 film, Futurama: Bender's Big Score. In 2000 Gore had offered to appear in the 2000 season finale of Futurama, "Anthology of Interest I". In this episode, Gore led his team of "Vice Presidential Action Rangers" in their goal to protect the space-time continuum. In 2002, Gore appeared in the episode "Crimes of the Hot". In addition, Gore used a short clip from Futurama to explain how global warming works in his presentations as well as in An Inconvenient Truth. An internet promo for An Inconvenient Truth titled A Terrifying Message From Al Gore was also produced by Groening and David X. Cohen, creators of Futurama, starring Gore and Bender (John DiMaggio).

=== Live Earth ===
On July 7, 2007, Live Earth benefit concerts were held around the world in an effort to raise awareness about climate change. The event was the brainchild of Gore and Kevin Wall of Save Our Selves. On July 21, 2007, Gore announced he was teaming with actress Cameron Diaz for a TV climate contest, 60 Seconds to Save the Earth, to gain people's support in solving the climate crisis.

=== South Park ===
Al Gore has appeared in South Park to warn the citizens of the town about the dangers of ManBearPig, a monster that is half man, half bear, and half pig, originally while Al Gore was ridiculed by the main characters Stan Marsh, Kenny McCormick, Kyle Broflovski, and Eric Cartman, they realized that Al Gore was being super cereal when ManBearPig was real and wreaking havoc in South Park and that it is Time to Get Cereal.

== 2007 Nobel Peace Prize and India ==
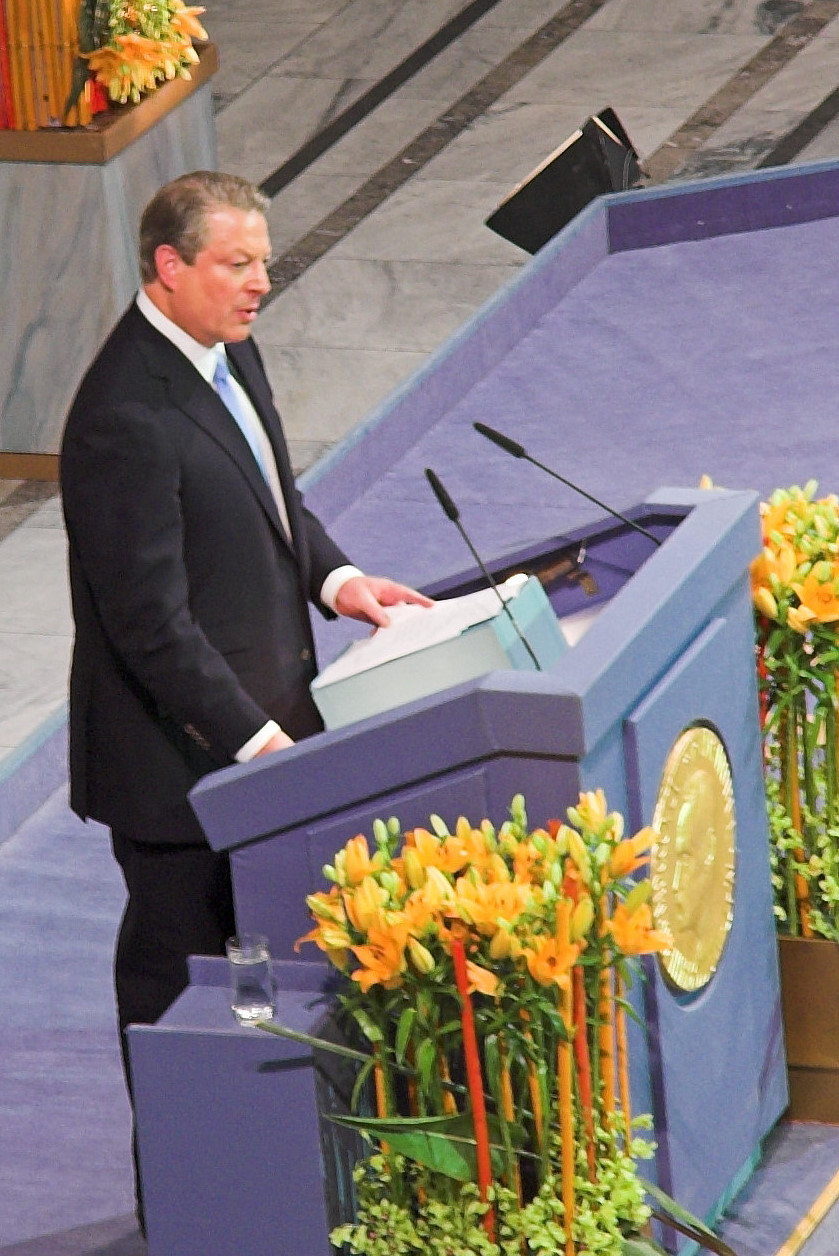
Al Gore receives the Nobel Peace Prize in the city hall of Oslo, December 10, 2007

Gore was awarded the 2007 Nobel Peace Prize, which was shared by the Intergovernmental Panel on Climate Change, headed by Rajendra K. Pachauri (Delhi, India). The award was given "for their efforts to build up and disseminate greater knowledge about man-made climate change, and to lay the foundations for the measures that are needed to counteract such change" on October 12, 2007.

Gore made the following statement after receiving the prize:

I am deeply honored to receive the Nobel Peace Prize. This award is even more meaningful because I have the honor of sharing it with the Intergovernmental Panel on Climate Change—the world's pre-eminent scientific body devoted to improving our understanding of the climate crisis—a group whose members have worked tirelessly and selflessly for many years. We face a true planetary emergency. The climate crisis is not a political issue, it is a moral and spiritual challenge to all of humanity. It is also our greatest opportunity to lift global consciousness to a higher level. My wife, Tipper, and I will donate 100 percent of the proceeds of the award to the Alliance for Climate Protection, a bipartisan non-profit organization that is devoted to changing public opinion in the U.S. and around the world about the urgency of solving the climate crisis.

Gore and Pachauri accepted the Nobel Peace Prize for 2007 in Oslo, Norway on December 10, 2007.

In the Lecture he delivered on December 10, 2007, in Oslo, fece to the Royal Highnesses of Norway, to the members of the Norwegian Nobel Committee and to the other ladies and gentlemen, who attended the ceremony for the Nobel prize-giving, he made this surprising statement:

Last September 21, as the Northern Hemisphere tilted away from the sun, scientists reported with unprecedented distress that the North Polar ice cap is "falling off a cliff." One study estimated that it could be completely gone during summer in less than 22 years. Another new study, to be presented by U.S. Navy researchers later this week, warns it could happen in as little as 7 years.

— Al Gore, from the Lecture delivered on December 10, 2007, in Oslo in occasion of the ceremony for the Nobel prize-giving

In a talk given during March 2008 in Delhi, Gore argued that India, as a leader in information technology, is in a particularly strong position to also lead the way in climate change. This talk coincided with the release of two children's books by Gore jointly published with the India Habitat Centre.

== Selected honors and awards ==
- 2008 Dan David Prize: "Social Responsibility with Particular Emphasis on the Environment."
- 2008 The Gore resolution (HJR712) passed by the Tennessee House of Representatives which honors Gore's "efforts to curb global warming."
- 2007 Gothenburg Prize for Sustainable Development
- 2007 Nobel Peace Prize with the Intergovernmental Panel on Climate Change (IPCC) (environment)
- 2007 International Academy of Television Arts and Sciences: Founders Award for Current TV and for work in the area of global warming
- 2007 Prince of Asturias Award in Spain (environment)
- 2007 The Sir David Attenborough Award for Excellence in Nature Filmmaking (environment)
- 2006 Quill Awards: History/current events/politics, An Inconvenient Truth

== Selected publications ==
=== Books ===
- Our Choice. Rodale Books. 2009. ISBN 978-1-59486-734-7.
- Al Gore (2008). Our Purpose: The Nobel Peace Prize Lecture 2007. Rodale Books. ISBN 978-1-60529-990-7.
- Know Climate Change and 101 Q and A on Climate Change from 'Save Planet Earth Series', 2008 (children's books)
- Al Gore (2006). An Inconvenient Truth: The Planetary Emergency of Global Warming and What We can do about it. New York: Rodale Books. ISBN 978-1-59486-567-1.
- Al Gore (1992). Earth in the Balance: Forging a New Common Purpose. Earthscan. ISBN 978-0-618-05664-4.

=== Articles, speeches, and introductions ===
- "We Can’t Wish Away Climate Change." The New York Times, February 27, 2010.
- "The Climate for Change." The New York Times, November 9, 2008.
- Transcript of Al Gore's speech at the Sierra Summit, September 9, 2005. (archived from the original on 2006-02-10)
- The Digital Earth: Understanding our planet in the 21st Century, by Vice President Al Gore, Given at the California Science Center, Los Angeles, California, on January 31, 1998.
- Vice President Al Gore's introduction to Earthwatch: 24 Hours In Cyberspace. February 8, 1996. 24 Hours in Cyberspace
- "Understanding Earth: Retrospectives and Visions post conferences report." GeoJournal, Volume 37, Number 3 / November 1995.
- "Introduction. In Silent Spring by Rachel Carson. 1994. New York : Houghton-Mifflin.
- The Climate Change Action Plan. Washington, D.C.: The White House, October 1993 (with William Clinton).
- "News briefs — Vice President Albert Gore, Jr., talks about the environment — Letter to the Editor". Science World. 50 (1). September 3, 1993. Archived from the original on December 7, 2007 – via FindArticles.
- Gore Jr, A (1992). "We must challenge the unthinkable". Integration (Tokyo, Japan) (31): 18–23. PMID 12284961.
- "Gaining our eco-librium." Forum for Applied Research and Public Policy; Vol/Issue: 5:2, June 1, 1990.
- Gore, Al Jr. (April 22, 1990). "To Skeptics on Global Warming . . ". The New York Times.
- Earth's Fate Is the No. 1 National Security Issue - The Washington Post, May 14, 1989

== Glossary ==
Al Gore uses the terms:

- Climate crisis (global warming/climate change).
- Climate refugee
- Energy tsunami (a loss of access to foreign oil).
- Megafire

== See also ==
- Climate Reality Project
- List of environmental philosophers
- World Resources Institute Board of Directors Biosketch for Al Gore
