= Fate of the World =

2011 video game

- Developer: Red Redemption Ltd
- Publishers: Red Redemption Ltd; Lace Mamba Global (EU)
- Producers: Gobion Rowlands; Klaude Thomas
- Designers: Matthew Miles Griffiths; Amy O'Neil; Ian Roberts
- Programmers: Richard Falconer; Sam Morris; Robin Tregaskis
- Artist: Carla Rylance
- Composer: Richard Jacques
- Engine: OGRE
- Platforms: Microsoft Windows; Mac OS
- Release: NA: 28 February 2011 (PC); NA: 29 September 2011 (MAC)
- Genre: Global warming game
- Mode: Single player

Fate of the World is a 2011 global warming game developed and published by Red Redemption. It features several scenarios, based on actual scientific research, in which the player is put in charge of a fictional international organization managing social, technological and environmental policies. The goals of the scenarios range from improving living conditions in Africa, to preventing catastrophic climate change, to exacerbating it. It is quickly followed by an expansion pack called Fate of the World: Tipping Point, released in late 2011. The climate prediction models for the game are the work of Myles Allen, the head of the Climate Dynamics group at the University of Oxford.

== Gameplay ==
Core gameplay interface, showing policy cards available in 2020 for North America

Fate of the World is a turn-based game; each turn representing five years. The starting date is typically 2020, and the final date depends on the scenario. In the core interface the player chooses policies to fund in each game turn, represented by "cards". These need to be distributed and balanced between twelve world regions, and many, such as a transition to electric cars, take several turns to implement locking up funds for the duration. The player also needs to manage public opinion with the risk of being banned from individual regions if public approval drops too low. Each scenario specifies a set of win and lose conditions, such as the amount of warming in degrees Celsius, human development index, production, industrial or otherwise, and how many regions the player is active in.

== Downloadable content ==
In Tipping Point, there are two downloadable content packs plus an extra pack which includes the soundtrack and designer notes of the game. In Migration DLC, in addition to the climate issues the player will also need to manage the climate refugees due to climate change. The Denial DLC is a scenario that takes the issue of climate change out of the game and instead focuses on growth with limited and diminishing resources.

== Reception ==
Reception

Aggregate score
Aggregator	Score
Metacritic	70/100 (TP) 69/100

Review scores
Publication	Score
Destructoid	6.5/10
Eurogamer	8/10
PC Gamer (UK)	(TP) 69% 61%

At launch, Fate of the World and Tipping Point received "mixed or average" reviews according to Metacritic, a video game review aggregator. PC Gamer wrote, "Its a worthy and handsome effort, but frustratingly badly explained, making it hard to play." Although praising the detail, PC Gamer called the expansion an "opaque and cruel game". Despite its difficulty, Eurogamer said that it is "never anything less than compelling".

== Sequel ==
Following the closure of Red Redemption, the rights to Fate of the World were acquired by another development studio, Soothsayer Games, which included some personnel who had worked on the original game. In 2015, they announced that they were working on an online multiplayer sequel, which was to be called Fate of the World Online. However, an unsuccessful Kickstarter campaign in 2017 meant that further development was unable to proceed. As of March 2019, Soothsayer Games were still actively seeking investment.

== See also ==
- Climate Challenge
