= Climate change in popular culture =

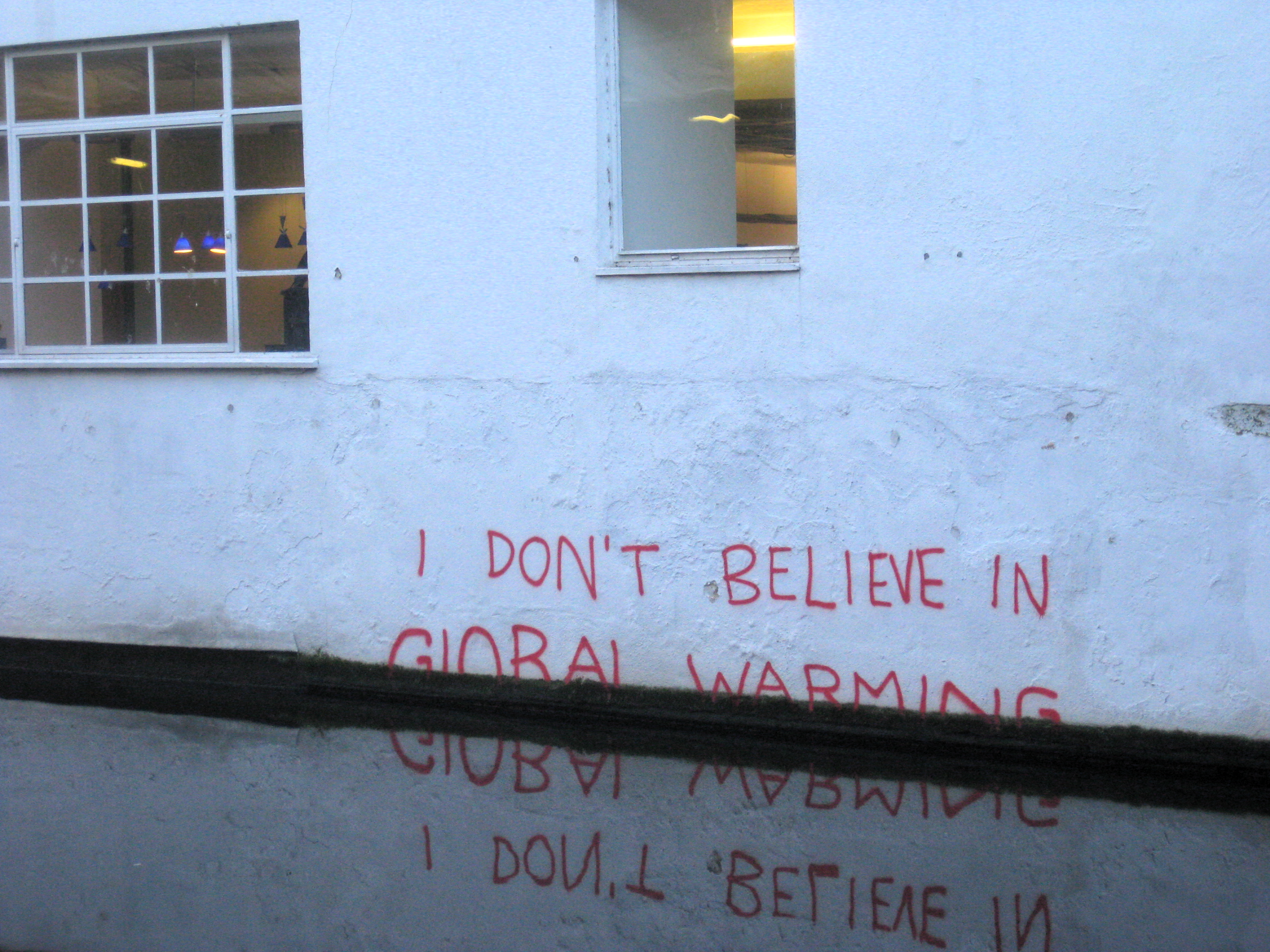
A satirical piece of graffiti by British artist Banksy, from 2009

References to climate change in popular culture have existed since the late 20th century and increased in the 21st century. Climate change, its impacts, and related human-environment interactions have been featured in nonfiction books and documentaries, but also literature, film, music, television shows and video games.

Science historian Naomi Oreskes noted in 2005 "a huge disconnect between what professional scientists have studied and learned in the last 30 years, and what is out there in the popular culture." An academic study in 2000 contrasted the relatively rapid acceptance of ozone depletion as reflected in popular culture with the much slower acceptance of the scientific consensus on climate change. Cultural responses have been posited as an important part of communicating climate change, but commentators have noted covering the topic has posed challenges due to its abstract nature. The prominence of climate change in popular culture increased during the 2010s, influenced by the climate movement, shifts in public opinion and changes in media coverage.

An important tool for evaluating the presence of climate change in popular culture is the Climate Reality Check. Like the Bechdel Test, it is a simple tool for evaluating climate change in any form of media, and consists of two conditions: "Climate change exists" in a narrative, and "a character knows it." An analysis of 250 of the most popular fictional films released between 2013 and 2022 and set in the present, recent past, or future found that only 12.8% passed the first part of the Climate Reality Check, and 9.6% passed the second part.

== Art ==
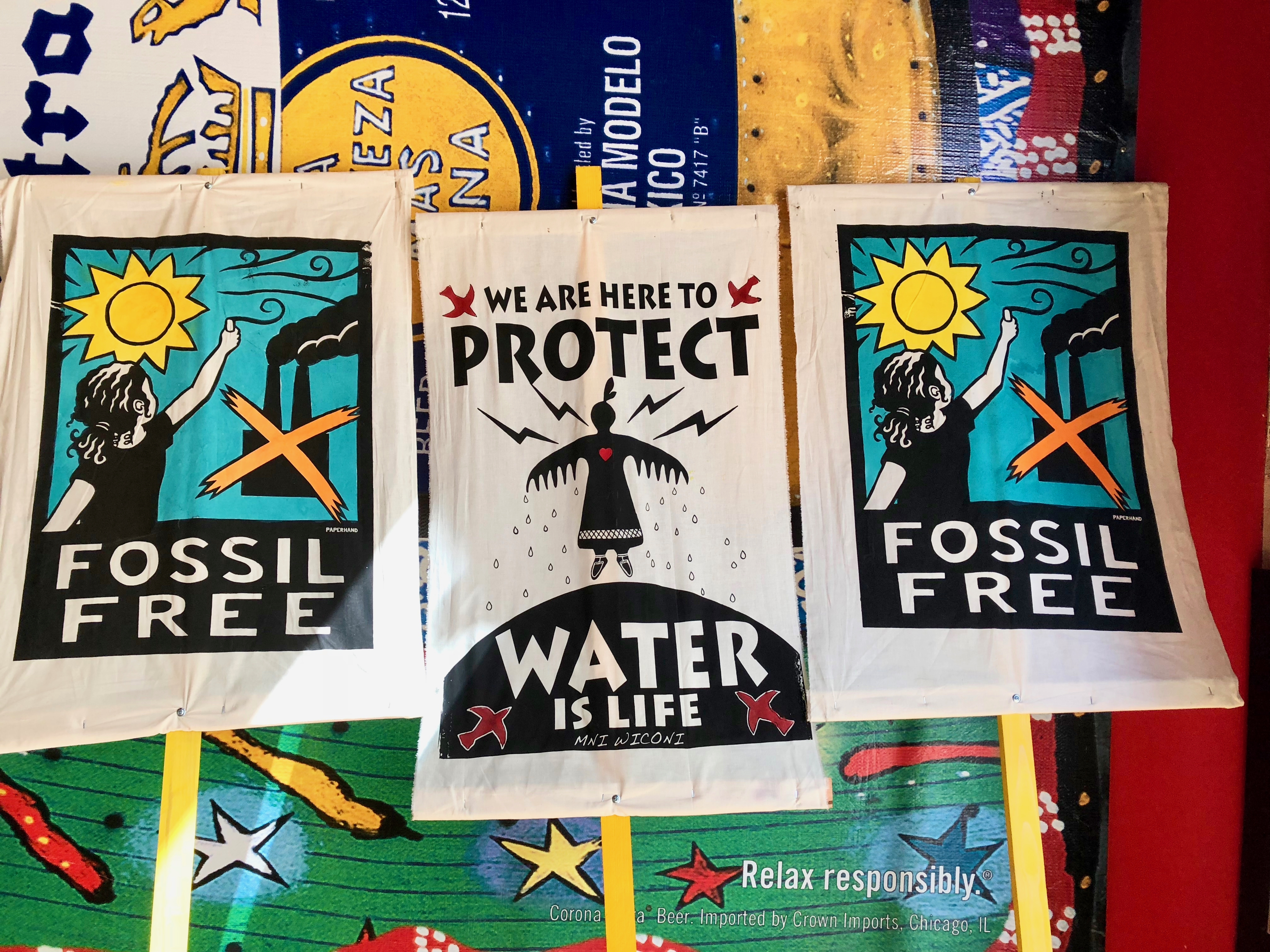
Climate change placards.

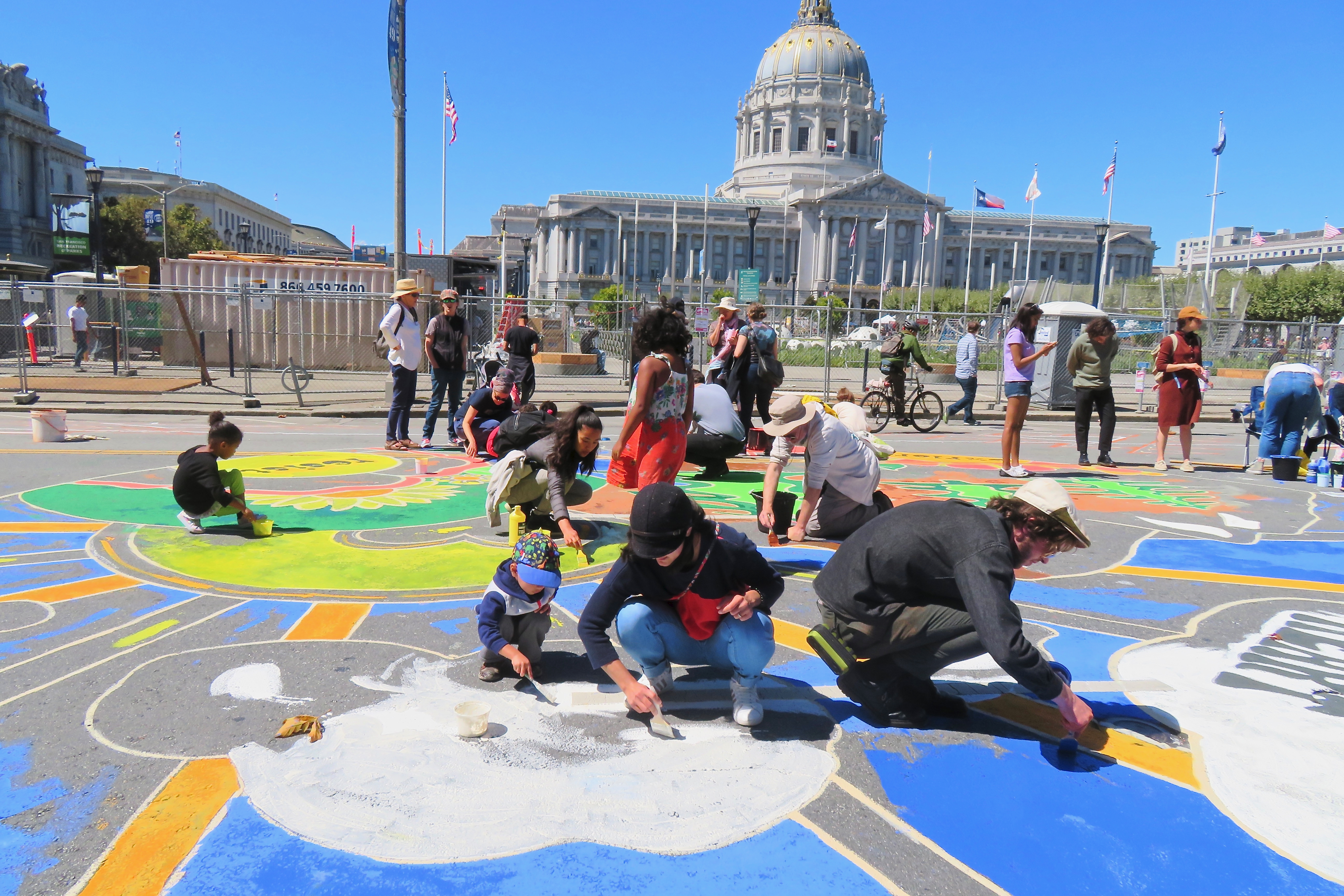
Mural created at the Climate Action March in San Francisco on 18 September 2018.

Climate change art is art inspired by climate change and global warming, generally intended to overcome humans' hardwired tendency to value personal experience over data and to disengage from data-based representations by making the data "vivid and accessible". One goal of climate change art is to "raise awareness of the crisis", as well as engage viewers politically and environmentally.

Some climate change art involves community involvement with the environment. Other approaches involve revealing socio-political concerns through their various artistic forms, such as painting, video, photography, sound and films. These works are intended to encourage viewers to reflect on their daily actions "in a socially responsible manner to preserve and protect the planet".

Climate change art is created both by scientists and by non-scientist artists. The field overlaps with data art.

== Film ==
=== Fictional films ===
A study of 250 of the most-watched fictional films released between 2013 and 2022 found that climate change existed in 12.8% of these films, while a global environmental problem (climate change, freshwater pollution, marine pollution, air pollution, deforestation, species extinction and biodiversity decline, or toxic waste) existed in 26%. The presence of climate change, as well as common climate impacts, increased substantially over time. But when climate change and other environmental problems were present, they were generally mentioned in just one or two scenes, and their gravity and/or urgency was not emphasized.

Similarly, research analyzing 32 commercially and culturally significant fiction films released between 1972 and 2023 found that portrayals of environmentally-motivated violence—‘eco-tage’ and eco-terrorism’—tended to present more extreme acts of climate defense as morally illegitimate, with more recent and commercially successful films generally favoring binary hero–villain characterizations over morally complex narratives.

Some films that have been identified as containing descriptions of or references to climate change include:

- Voyage to the Bottom of the Sea (1961) – A meteor shower ignites the Van Allen radiation belt and causes abrupt global warming that will render Earth uninhabitable within three weeks. The United Nations attempts to resolve this by sending the submarine USOS Seaview into the Mariana Trench to fire a nuclear missile at the flaming belt.
- The Day the Earth Caught Fire (1961) – Nuclear weapons testing by the United States and the Soviet Union tilt the Earth's nutation by 11 degrees, causing Earth to begin spiraling towards the Sun and global temperatures to rise. The world's governments attempt to solve the problem by detonating nuclear bombs in Siberia to correct the tilt.
- Soylent Green (1973), film directed by Richard Fleischer and starring Charlton Heston. Set in a dystopian future of dying oceans and year-round humidity due to the greenhouse effect, resulting in suffering from pollution, poverty, overpopulation and depleted resources.
- Blade Runner (1982), a film directed by Ridley Scott and starring Harrison Ford and Rutger Hauer, is set in a humid rainy climate changed Los Angeles in an alternate 2015, based loosely on the novel Do Androids Dream of Electric Sheep?. Its 2017 sequel Blade Runner 2049 is also noted for its depiction of a warmer climate.
- Split Second, 1992 film starring Rutger Hauer and Kim Cattrall is set in 2008, in a London that is flooded as a result of global warming.
- Waterworld (1995) starring Kevin Costner. Set in 2500, where the polar ice caps have melted due to global warming and Earth is almost entirely covered with water.
- The Arrival (1996), starring Charlie Sheen. Extraterrestrial aliens attempt to secretly cause global warming and thereby xenoform Earth into an environment more suited to their needs.
- A.I. Artificial Intelligence (2001), set in climate changed world near flooded ruins of New York City, where global warming has led to ecological disasters all over the world in the mid-22nd century. 2,000 years later, the world has entered a new ice age and is populated by advanced robots known as Specialists.
- The Day After Tomorrow (2004) directed by Roland Emmerich and starring Dennis Quaid. An abrupt shutdown of thermohaline circulation causes catastrophic abrupt climate change, plunging the Northern Hemisphere into a new ice age. As a result, the Northern United States, Canada, Europe, East Asia, and Russia are devastated by massive winter storms, and the surviving population of the United States is evacuated to Mexico. The film has been cited as one of the few blockbuster films to discuss climate change.
- The Day the Earth Stood Still (2008) – Klaatu lands on Earth as an alien delegation to either convince humanity to halt its destructive behavior or destroy it. The film notably updates the original film's Cold War-era concern with nuclear warfare and mutually assured destruction into the contemporary issue of climate change.
- The Thaw (2009) – Melting ice caps defrost the remains of a woolly mammoth infected with deadly parasites, which spread to a research crew sent to Banks Island.
- The Age of Stupid (2009), drama-documentary-animation hybrid directed by Franny Armstrong and starring Pete Postlethwaite as a man living alone in the devastated world of 2055, watching archive footage from 2008 and asking "Why didn't we stop climate change when we had the chance?"
- Earth 2100 (2009), predictions of possible attempts at adaptation to and mitigation of the effects of continuing global warming.
- Birdemic: Shock and Terror (2010) and Birdemic 2: The Resurrection (2013), where global warming mutates birds to begin attacking humanity.
- The Expedition to the End of the World (2013), director: Daniel Dencik, relating to the Greenland ice sheet and the retreat of glaciers since 1850.
- The Colony (2013), climate modification towers are built to cool the planet, but cause an Ice Age, forcing humans to live underground.
- Snowpiercer is a 2014 fictional film regarding a problematic solar geoengineering attempt that inadvertently freezes the earth.
- Into the Storm (2014), in which a character hints that major storms are becoming more frequent.
- First Reformed is a 2017 film in which a Reformed Church in America pastor discovers the causes and effects of climate change and attempts to take violent action against those he considers responsible.
- Climate Change Denial Disorder is a satirical short film which parodies climate change denial and perspectives on climate change through discussion of a fictional disease.
- Downsizing (2017) – In the future scientists discover a method to shrink humans to size of five inches to solve climate change and overpopulation. The technique fails when only three percent of the population choose to undergo it, with its inventor discovering that humanity will go extinct from positive feedback of Arctic methane emissions within 100 years.
- Geostorm (2017) – Natural disasters caused by climate change lead humanity to construct a network of weather modification satellites in 2019, which malfunction and cause severe weather across the world in 2022.
- Fast Color (2018), is set in a future American Midwest suffering from an eight-year drought.
- Bo Burnham: Inside (2021), the special includes several references to climate change and the danger of a climate apocalypse. For instance, the lyric "20,000 years of this, seven more to go" in the song "That Funny Feeling" is believed to be a reference to the Climate Clock showing the time left to reduce greenhouse gas emissions before 1.5 C global warming becomes inevitable.
- The Tomorrow War (2021), melting ice sheets from global warming thaw a frozen spaceship under the Academy of Sciences Glacier from the 10th century AD filled with weaponized bio-engineered aliens known as "Whitespikes" in November 2048, which completely overrun Earth and almost completely annihilate humanity by 2051.
- Reminiscence (2021), a film set in a post-apocalyptic future where Miami has been flooded by the ocean due to climate change.
- Don't Look Up (2021). An apocalyptic black comedy film, in which two astronomers from Michigan State University unsuccessfully attempt to warn the world of a comet coming to impact Earth and destroy humanity within six months. The film is intended to satirize public denial and apathy towards climate change from governments, the media, and corporations.
- How to Blow Up a Pipeline (2022), based on the non-fictional book of the same name by Andreas Malm
- Digger (2026), a satirical black comedy film about an oil magnate causing an ecological disaster.

=== Documentary films ===
- An Inconvenient Truth (2006) is an American documentary film made in 2006 directed by Davis Guggenheim which covers former United States Vice President Al Gore's campaign related to raising awareness about global warming. An Inconvenient Sequel: Truth to Power is a follow-up film released in 2017.
- The 11th Hour (2007), created, produced and narrated by Leonardo DiCaprio.
- Signos: Banta ng Pagbabagong Klima, a 2008 Philippine television documentary presented and narrated by actor Richard Gutierrez and aired on GMA Network.
- The Great Global Warming Swindle, a 2009 polemical film that denies the existence of climate change.
- Carbon Nation, a 2010 documentary film.
- Chasing Ice, a 2012 documentary film.
- White Knight, a 2012 documentary film
- Thin Ice, a 2013 documentary film.
- Merchants of Doubt, a 2014 documentary based on the 2010 book of the same name
- Before the Flood, a 2016 documentary
- Chasing Coral, a 2017 documentary
- 2040, a 2019 documentary by Damon Gameau
- Climate Change – The Facts, a 2019 BBC documentary presented by David Attenborough
- Planet of the Humans, a 2019 documentary directed by Michael Moore
- I Am Greta, a documentary following teenaged climate activist Greta Thunberg

== Literature ==
=== Non-fiction ===
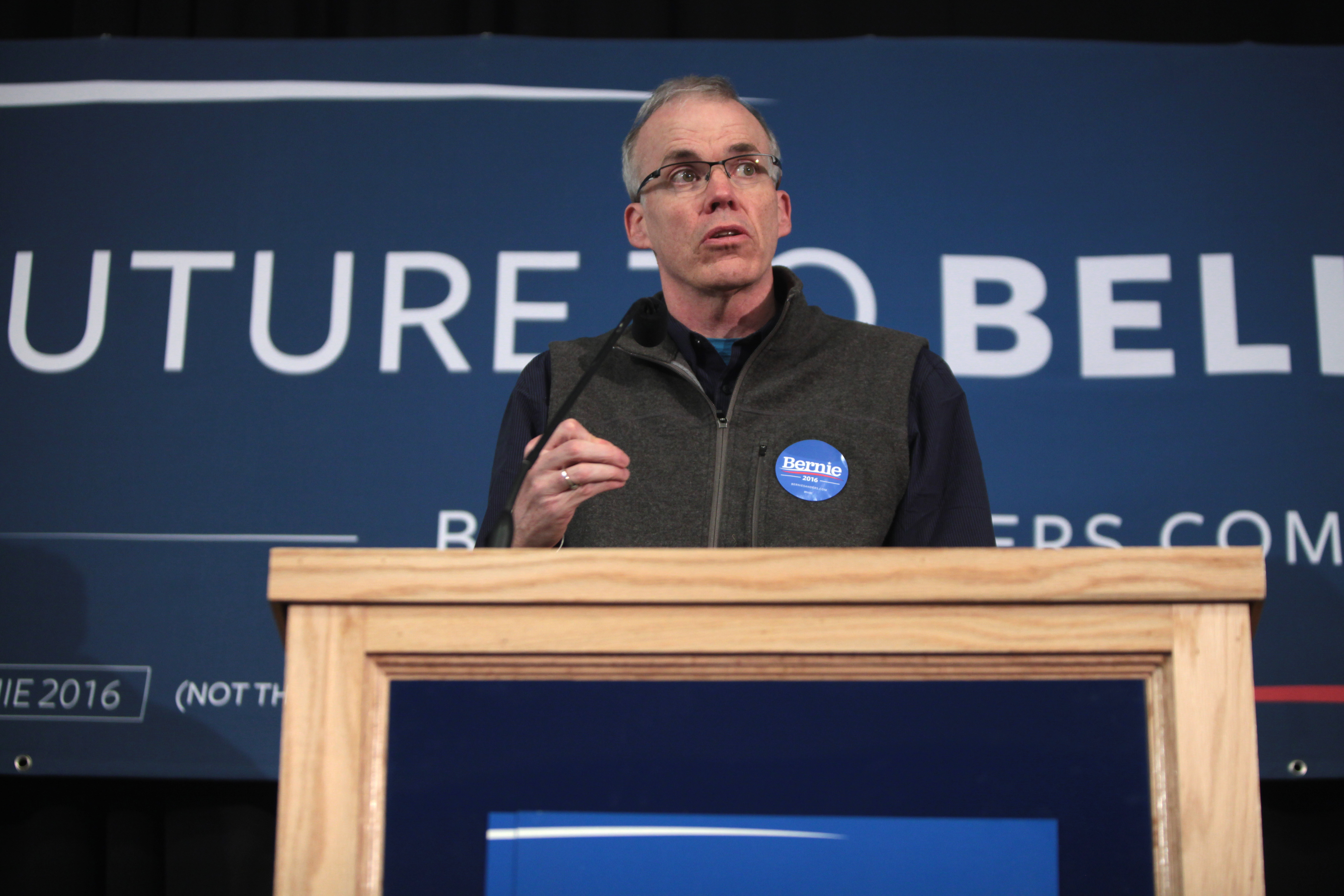
Bill McKibben, author of The End of Nature.

This refers to the classification non-fiction, without regard to whether the books are accurate or intended to be accurate.

- The End of Nature, a 1989 book by Bill McKibben, has been cited as the first book on climate change written for a general audience.
- Our Angry Earth: A Ticking Ecological Bomb (1991) by Isaac Asimov and Frederik Pohl
- Earth in the Balance (1992) by Al Gore, recommending a "Global Marshall Plan" to resolve ecological crises such as climate change
- The Carbon War: Global Warming and the End of the Oil Era 1999 book by former oil geologist Jeremy Leggett
- The Coming Global Superstorm (1999) by Whitley Streiber and Art Bell, predicting the possibility of abrupt climate change from a shutdown of thermohaline circulation
- The Discovery of Global Warming 2003 Spencer R. Weart book describing the history of climate change science
- The Weather Makers (2005) by Tim Flannery, a series of essays describing the effects of climate change
- Field notes from a catastrophe: man, nature, and climate change (2006) by Elizabeth Kolbert describing effects from climate change already occurring in the natural world, as well as opposition to climate change mitigation from corporations and the Bush administration
- Hell and High Water (2006) by Joseph J. Romm warning about the consequences of sea level rise
- An Inconvenient Truth: The Planetary Emergency of Global Warming and What We Can Do About It is a 2006 book by Al Gore released in conjunction with the film An Inconvenient Truth. Based on Gore's lecture tour on the topic of global warming this book elaborates upon points offered in the film. It "brings together leading-edge research from top scientists around the world; photographs, charts, and other illustrations; and personal anecdotes and observations to document the fast pace and wide scope of global warming."
- Six Degrees: Our Future on a Hotter Planet (2007) by Mark Lynas. It presents the consequences of climate change for each additional degree Celsius of warming, culminating in a possible 6 degree scenario in which release of methane hydrate leads to an extinction event similar to the Cambrian–Ordovician extinction event. The book was also adapted into a National Geographic Channel film.
- Scorcher: The Dirty Politics of Climate Change (2007) by Clive Hamilton, criticizing the government of Australia for blocking international climate change mitigation
- Break Through (2007) by Ted Nordhaus and Michael Shellenberger, arguing that the paradigms motivating the environmentalist movement are poorly suited to resolve climate change
- An Appeal to Reason (2008) by Nigel Lawson, criticizing the scientific consensus on climate change
- Hot, Flat, and Crowded (2008) by Thomas Friedman, arguing that the United States could reclaim a sense of purpose after the September 11 attacks and the end of the Cold War by solving issues of overpopulation and climate change
- Why We Disagree About Climate Change (2009) by Mike Hulme, exploring the reasons for differing ethical, political, cultural, and economic views on climate change across the world
- Carbon Shift (2009) by Thomas Homer-Dixon and Nick Garrison, explaining how the likely effects of peak oil and climate change on Canada
- Requiem for a Species (2010) by Clive Hamilton, arguing that climate change has already progressed past the point at which catastrophic impacts for the world and human society, including possible societal collapse or extinction, can be avoided
- Merchants of Doubt (2010) by Naomi Oreskes and Erik M. Conway, which examines the history of climate change denial and its relationship with the tobacco industry playbook.
- The God Species (2011) by Mark Lynas, postulating that climate change indicates that Earth has entered an anthropocene epoch in which natural systems are under human control
- 2052: A Global Forecast for the Next Forty Years (2012) by Jørgen Randers, arguing that current trends suggest carbon emissions will peak around 2030 but that it will be insufficient to prevent 2 degree Celsius warming which will limit future economic growth
- The Hockey Stick and the Climate Wars (2012) by Michael E. Mann, explaining the temperature record of the last 2,000 years and his work on the so-called "hockey stick graph"
- This Changes Everything (2014) by Naomi Klein, which criticises capitalism as a root cause of climate change.
- The Sixth Extinction: An Unnatural History (2015) by Elizabeth Kolbert, which won the Pulitzer Prize for General Nonfiction and explained the concept of the Holocene extinction.
- The Great Derangement: Climate Change and the Unthinkable (2016) by Amitav Ghosh, arguing that climate change is driven by neoimperialism
- Drawdown (2017) which ranks different climate change solutions.
- Deep Adaptation (2018) by Jem Bendell, arguing that climate change has progressed too far to prevent societal collapse and that people must accept major changes to their way of life to adjust to the coming changes.
- Losing Earth (2019) by Nathaniel Rich, based on a New York Times Magazine article, examining attempts to implement climate change policies in the United States from 1979 into the 1980s.
- No One Is Too Small to Make a Difference (2019) by Greta Thunberg, collection of speeches presented before the United Nations, the European Union, the World Economic Forum, the United States Congress, the French National Assembly, and climate protests.
- The Uninhabitable Earth (2019) by David Wallace-Wells, based on a 2017 magazine series of the same name explaining the likely consequences of climate change on human society in future years.
- On Fire (2019) by Naomi Klein, advocating substantial climate change mitigation tactics such as the Green New Deal.
- A Life on Our Planet (2020) by David Attenborough, an autobiography describing his career in the BBC since the 1950s during the Holocene extinction and warning about the consequences of biodiversity loss from climate change.
- How to Avoid a Climate Disaster (2021) by Bill Gates, providing tactics to reach carbon neutrality by 2050, particularly greater investment in sustainable energy technology.
- How to Blow Up a Pipeline (2021) by Andreas Malm, advocating violent techniques such as sabotage in climate activism.
- The New Climate War (2021) by Michael Mann, describing resistance to climate change mitigation from the fossil fuel industry.
- Under a White Sky (2021) by Elizabeth Kolbert, exploring possible technological solutions to climate change such as solar geoengineering.

=== Fiction ===
Climate fiction (sometimes shortened to cli-fi) is literature that deals with climate change. Generally speculative in nature but inspired by climate science, works of climate fiction may take place in the world as we know it, in the near future, or in fictional worlds experiencing climate change. The genre frequently includes science fiction and dystopian or utopian themes, imagining potential futures based on research about the impacts of climate change and speculations about how humans may respond to these and the problem of climate change. Climate fiction typically involves anthropogenic climate change and other environmental issues as opposed to weather and disaster more generally. Technologies such as climate engineering or climate adaptation practices often feature prominently in works exploring their impacts on society.

The publication of Kim Stanley Robinson's The Ministry for the Future in 2020 helped cement the genre's emergence; the work generated presidential and United Nations mentions and an invitation for Robinson to meet planners at the Pentagon. University courses on literature and environmental issues may include climate change fiction in their syllabi. This body of literature has been discussed by a variety of publications, including The New York Times, The Guardian, and Dissent magazine, among other international media outlets. Lists of climate fiction have been compiled by organizations including Grist, Outside Magazine, and the New York Public Library. Academics and critics study the potential impact of fiction on the broader field of climate change communication.

== Music ==
Climate change has been a topic of some popular music, particularly during the 2010s. The topic has been discussed in various genres, including pop, folk, electronic music and heavy metal. The New York Times found 192 references to climate change in English-language songs that entered the Billboard charts between 1999 and 2019, with around half of those (87 songs) between 2015 and 2019.

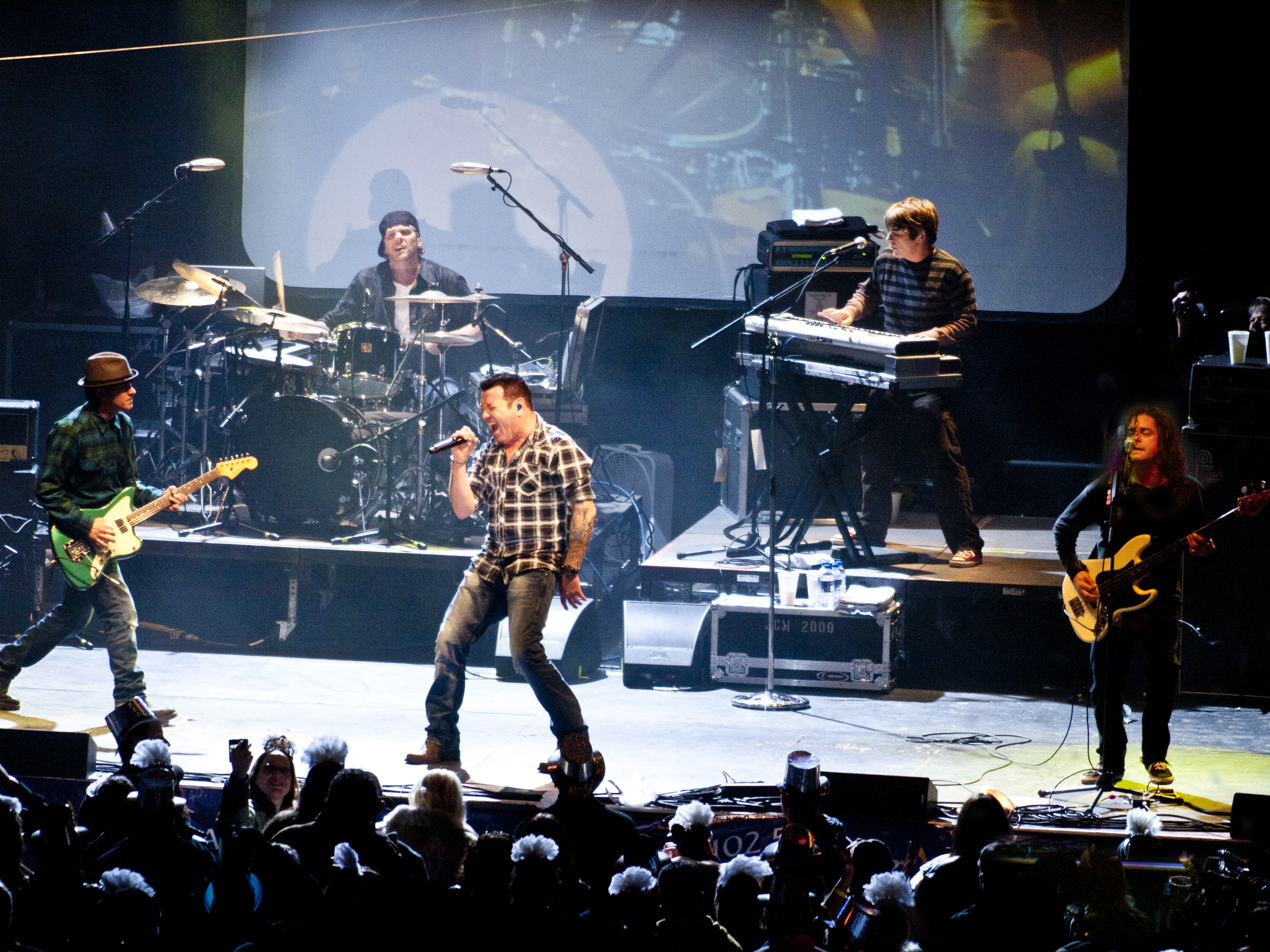
American rock band Smash Mouth performing in 2011. The New York Times listed their 1999 song "All Star" #1 on their list of top 10 climate change songs.

- American thrash metal band Testament released a song titled "Greenhouse Effect" on 1989 album Practice What You Preach and later referenced climate change in "Fall of Sipledome" on The Gathering (1999).
- American rapper Mos Def's "New World Water" (1999) on Black on Both Sides discusses the history of water access and scarcity, including the impact of climate change.
- American pop rock group Smash Mouth make reference to climate change in their songs "Walkin' on the Sun" (1997) and "All Star" (1999).
- French metal band Gojira have released several songs about climate change and environmental issues, particularly "Global Warming", "World to Come" and other songs on From Mars to Sirius (2005).
- Melissa Etheridge's "I Need to Wake Up" (2006), which was the theme song to the film An Inconvenient Truth.
- Climate change is a theme of English rock band Radiohead's 2000 song "Idioteque" and 2016 album A Moon Shaped Pool. Frontman Thom Yorke has also explored climate change on his solo album The Eraser (2006).
- Thirty Seconds to Mars' 2007 single "A Beautiful Lie" was released alongside a music video that was filmed in Greenland, and highlights impacts of climate change on the island. The band also launched a tie-in website promoting individual action on climate change.
- American rapper Pitbull has released albums titled Global Warming (2012) and Climate Change (2017).
- Indonesian band Kotak through the 2012 album Terbaik contains a song called "Hijaukan Bumi", the lyrics and music video contain every cause and impact of climate change.
- "Love Song to the Earth" was a 2015 charity single produced in the run up to the 2015 UN Climate Change Conference. Paul McCartney, Jon Bon Jovi, Sheryl Crow and Sean Paul all sang on the single.
- British musician Anohni's 2016 song "4 Degrees" discusses climate change and extinction. It references projected rise in global temperature and impacts of climate change on biodiversity by 2100.
- OneRepublic's "Truth to Power" (2017) which was the theme song to An Inconvenient Sequel: Truth to Power.
- American rapper Childish Gambino's "Feels Like Summer" (2018).
- Singer-songwriter Weyes Blood's Titanic Rising (2019) features several songs that discuss climate change.
- Australian rock band King Gizzard & the Lizard Wizard have released several songs about climate change, and it is a central theme of 2019 album Infest the Rats' Nest which follows characters who are forced to leave Earth to escape climate change impacts.
- Composer Matthew Burtner's Glacier Music (2019) is intended as emulating melting glaciers.
- Lil Dicky released charity single "Earth" in 2019, featuring numerous celebrities and other musicians.
- American pop singer Billie Eilish's 2019 single "All the Good Girls Go to Hell" makes reference to California wildfires and sea level rise.
- English band The 1975's eponymous 2019 song features a spoken word passage by environmental activist Greta Thunberg. Adapted from her "Our House Is on Fire" speech, her passage in the song calls for civil disobedience to demand action on climate change. Proceeds from the song were donated to activist group Extinction Rebellion.
- Japanese-British singer Rina Sawayama has said her 2020 single "XS" is a critique of capitalism in the context of climate change.
- Canadian musician Grimes's 2020 album Miss Anthropocene is a concept album about an "anthropomorphic goddess of climate change" and human extinction.
- The music video for Pearl Jam's 2020 single "Retrograde" depicts the impacts of climate change, and features climate activist Greta Thunberg.
- Brazilian metal band Sepultura's 2020 song "Guardians of Earth" is about climate change, deforestation and indigenous people in their home country.
- Trip-hop group Massive Attack released a song on their 2020 EP Eutopia that features a speech by Christiana Figueres, the diplomat who wrote the Paris Agreement, urging for action on climate change.
- Marina's 2021 single "Purge the Poison"
- Climate change is a central theme of Australian rock band Midnight Oil's final album Resist (2022).
- Greg Barnett's triple album "The Flat White Album" (2020) is bookended by two climate related songs, The C-Bomb and Frogs in a Pan, with another ... Earthrise ... as the penultimate and perhaps hardest-hitting track due to its minimalistc production.

== Theater ==
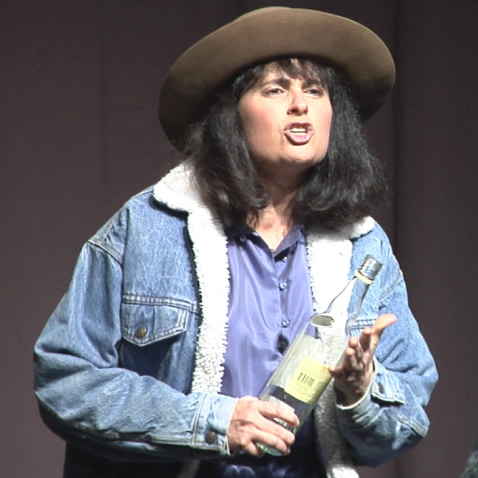
Still from a 2010 performance of The Climate Monologues.

- The Contingency Plan (2009) by Steve Waters is a diptych of plays first performed at the Bush Theatre in London. They are set in the near future, at a time during which severe tidal surges begin to submerge parts of coastal Britain.
- The Climate Monologues (2010).
- The Heretic (2011)
- 2071 (2014) by climate scientist Chris Rapley and playwright Duncan Macmillan.

== Television ==
=== Television documentaries ===
- Years of Living Dangerously, nine-part 2014 Showtime documentary television series

=== Fictional television ===
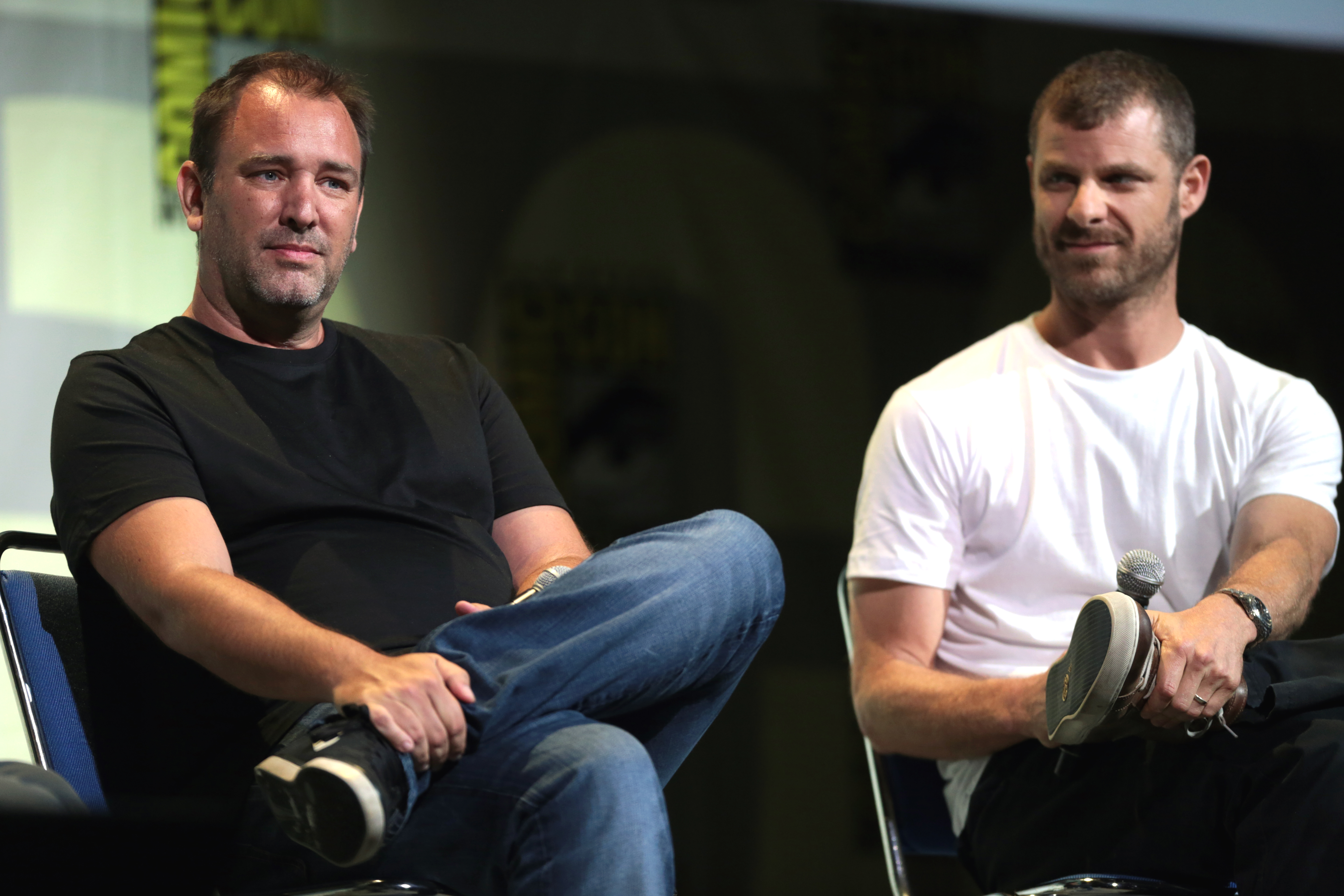
Trey Parker and Matt Stone, creators of adult animated comedy series South Park. South Park has parodied climate change on several occasions, particularly focusing on the environmental activism of politician Al Gore.

- Captain Planet and the Planeteers had numerous episodes which dealt with global-warming including "Two Futures", "Heat Wave", "Domes of Doom", "The Ark", "Summit to Save Earth", "Greenhouse Planet", "A Perfect World", and "Planeteers Under Glass".
- "The World Set Free" (Cosmos: A Spacetime Odyssey), 2014 TV series episode
- South Park spoofed global warming in seven episodes:
  - "Spontaneous Combustion" (1999) - Randy Marsh wins a Nobel Prize by discovering that a string of spontaneous combustions around South Park was caused by partners refusing to fart in front of each other and solving the crisis by having the town's residents fart every few seconds, only for the resultant methane emissions to cause global warming and a massive heat wave.
  - "Terrance and Phillip: Behind the Blow" (2001) - Environmentalists host an Earth Day festival at South Park to raise awareness about global warming, brainwashing its residents into supporting propagandistic slogans using Jedi mind tricks. The boys struggle to arrange for Canadian comedians Terrance and Phillip to perform at the festival.
  - "Goobacks" (2004) - Climate refugees from the year 3045 begin using a time portal to travel to Earth in 2004 for work, leading to a controversy mirroring the debate over illegal immigration as they work for low wages.
  - "Two Days Before the Day After Tomorrow" (2005) - Stan Marsh pretends that a flood caused by him crashing a boat into a beaver dam was caused by global warming, leading to a panic. The episode was meant to parody the government response to Hurricane Katrina, as well as explanations that it was caused by climate change.
  - "Smug Alert!" (2006) - Drivers of hybrid cars cause massive emissions of "smug," causing a superstorm which annihilates San Francisco and South Park.
  - "ManBearPig" (2006) - Al Gore visits South Park warning about a giant carnivorous monster known as the ManBearPig and takes the protagonists to search for it in the Cave of the Winds, only for it to become evident that Gore is using the incident to get attention. The episode parodies Gore's climate change activism and reflects series co-creators Trey Parker and Matt Stone's climate change skepticism at the time of the episode's release.
  - "Time to Get Cereal"/"Nobody Got Cereal?" (2018) - ManBearPig is revealed to have been real and begins attacking South Park's residents, some of whom nevertheless remain skeptical of its existence. The boys are forced to apologize to Gore to get him to help, although he remains self-aggrandizing. At the end of the arc, the townsfolk finally admit that the ManBearPig was real and begin negotiating for it to leave, but are unable to accept the creature's terms for its departure. Parker and Stone wrote the episode as an apology for the show's previous depictions of climate change, and Gore himself praised the episode.
- Star Trek: The Next Generation had several global-warming themed episodes:
  - Episode "Deja Q" (1990) - The crew suggests an artificial amplification of global warming using greenhouse gases to counter the cooling effects of dust from the impact of a moon on a planet.
  - Episode "A Matter of Time" (Season 5 EP 9) - A passing cloud of dust from an asteroid causes global cooling on a planet, the crew of the enterprise use a phaser to release frozen deposits of carbon dioxide on the planet.
  - "The Inner Light" (1992) - Jean-Luc Picard lives a lifetime on a planet experiencing global warming and aridification. Ultimately, the climate change becomes serious enough to threaten all life on the planet. The episode won a Hugo Award and is considered one of the series' best episodes.
- Teenage Mutant Ninja Turtles (1987) has four episodes dealing with global warming. In "Shredder's Mom", Shredder and Krang use a mirror fixed to a satellite to warm up the Earth if the political leaders do not surrender to them. The Teenage Mutant Ninja Turtles get help from General Yogure to stop them. In Northern Lights Out, a man named Eric Red in Norway plans to melt the polar ice cap and flood all the coastal cities on the Earth by blowing up underground volcanoes, which will make it "easy" for Eric and his gang to take over the Earth. In "A Real Snow Job", set in the Alps in Austria, Krang and Shredder use a Zoetropic wave device to melt the world's ice, flooding the coastal cities and making the Earth easy for Krang and Shredder to take over. In "Too Hot to Handle", Vernon Fenwick's nephew Foster has an invention that brings the Earth closer to the Sun, a "Solar Magnet".
- The 1980s Transformers animated series had at least one global-warming themed episode: "The Revenge of Bruticus". There, the Combaticons (a faction of the series' main villains, the Decepticons, created by rebel Decepticon Starscream) use the Space Bridge device to hurl Earth toward the Sun, hoping to destroy the Earth and all enemies. The Autobots are forced to help the humans endure the heat while putting aside their differences with the Decepticons in a race against time to restore Earth to its natural orbit.
- The TV series Utopia (2013–14) is a violent thriller about a fictional conspiracy that has a number of secret agents embedded in key places in government and industry. The conspiracy, known as "The Network", seeks to frighten the populace into taking a vaccine which will, as a side-effect, cause mass infertility. Their aim in doing so is to reduce the number of humans on the planet, in order to tackle climate change, resource shortages and other environmental issues.
- The Simpsons:
  - "On a Clear Day I Can't See My Sister" (2005) - Springfield Elementary School goes on a field trip to the Springfield Glacier, which is almost completely melted because of climate change.
  - "The Good, the Sad, and the Drugly" (2009) - Lisa is assigned to write a report on the year 2059 and becomes depressed after learning about the future effects of climate change, terrifying the class with her reports.
  - "White Christmas Blues" (2013) - Global warming causes no snowfall on Christmas for the entire United States except in Springfield, which is cooled by smog from Mr. Burns's nuclear power plant and the local tire factory
- The science fiction TV drama Life Force (2000) depicts much of Earth flooded by runaway global warming in 2025. The vast majority of its ecologically driven plot aspects spring naturally from this situation, such as climate refugees being brutally used for farming slave labour in episode 4 ("Greenhouse Effect"), civilians turning to look for old parts for electricity generators at scrap heaps or local markets using Euros and bartering as currency instead of pound sterling in episode 7 ("Beware of the Dog"), and manipulative sun-worshipping cults luring people in with rare natural ingredients for protective cream in episode 9 ("Siren Song").
- In the Loki episode "The Variant" (2021), Earth experiences a series of climate-related natural disasters in the mid-21st century implied to have been caused by climate change. Mobius M. Mobius mentions that the extinction of the swallow at that time resulted in ecological collapse.
- Doctor Who, "Orphan 55" (2020) - The Thirteenth Doctor takes Graham O'Brien, Ryan Sinclair, and Yasmin Khan to a spa in the future which proves to be a trap on the abandoned planet Orphan 55. They later discover it is an abandoned version of Earth wrecked by climate change and nuclear warfare, and inhabited by mutant humans known as "Dregs." The episode ends with the Doctor telling them that although it is only one possible future she cannot guarantee it will not come to pass.
- The first ever crossover episodes of rival British soap operas Casualty, Coronation Street, Doctors, EastEnders, Emmerdale, Holby City and Hollyoaks aired in 2021, which all featured references to climate change in the lead up to the 2021 United Nations Climate Change Conference.
- The opening timelapse animation of The Expanse shows sea level rise covering Liberty Island until a sea wall is built by the United Nations which has become a world government.

=== Late-night television ===
- On September 22, 2021, a group of American late-night television hosts—Samantha Bee, Trevor Noah, Jimmy Kimmel, Seth Meyers, James Corden, Stephen Colbert, and Jimmy Fallon—devoted portions of their respective shows to climate change-related material.

== Comic books ==
- Teenage Mutant Ninja Turtles Adventures from Archie Comics. Mostly set in their present (late 1980s and early 1990s), but also including time travels to a future, in which New York City is flooded because of global warming and the greenhouse effect.

== Video games ==
- Civilization (1991) is a strategy game in which the pollution created by industrial production and transportation, if left unchecked, leads to desertification and coastal regions becoming swamps.
- In 2008, the TamaTown website featured a game that taught children how to prevent global warming.
- Fuel (2009) is a racing video game set in a post-apocalyptic world ravaged by extreme weather fueled by global warming.
- Shin Megami Tensei: Strange Journey (2010) is a role-playing video game about a special task force sent to investigate the Schwarzwelt, a destructive spatial distortion spreading from Antarctica and threatening to engulf the world, reminiscent of the ozone layer hole. Inside the Schwarzwelt, players find and explore alternate dimensions built around human activities harmful to the environment such as war, pollution, and excessive consumerism, as well as demons who seek to destroy humanity and return the world to its pre-human state.
- Civilization VI: Gathering Storm (2019) includes a mechanic where carbon emissions lead to sea level rise, permanent coastal flooding and an increase in the intensity and frequency of extreme weather events.
- Battlefield 2042 (2021) is set in 2041 where a global military conflict is driven by the exacerbation of tensions from resource depletion and extreme weather caused by climate change. A massive influx of climate refugees and category 6 hurricanes lead to an economic depression in 2034 and the dissolution of the European Union following the collapse of Germany in 2035. Although technological development causes human society to begin to recover in 2037, a Kessler syndrome event destroying 70 percent of Earth's satellites pushes the world into war between stateless proxies fighting for the United States and Russia.

== Stand-up comedy ==
- Comedians including Michelle Wolf, Nate Bargatze, and Joel Kim Booster have made jokes related to climate change.

== Other ==
- Climate fiction is a popular media genre which frequently features stories of climate apocalypse. Examples include Ishmael, a 1992 philosophical novel, and Mad Max: Fury Road, a 2015 action film.
- Concern over a climate apocalypse has been the subject of satirical news articles. One theme is popular revolt against power brokers. Another are fantasies about the romance and adventure of people experiencing the chaos of ecological and societal collapse.
- What if it's a big hoax and we create a better world for nothing?, a 2009 satirical cartoon by Joel Pett
- Keep Cool, a board game
- Mothers of Invention, a feminist podcast

== See also ==
- Climate change art
- Catastrophes in popular culture
- Climate fiction
- Media coverage of climate change
- Climate communication
