= Keep Cool =

Keep Cool may refer to:

- Keep Cool (film), a 1997 Chinese black comedy directed by Zhang Yimou
- Keep Cool (board game), a German-made global warming board game
- Keep Cool Records an American record label
