= Enter the Exit =

Enter the Exit may refer to:

- "Enter the Exit" (Battle for Dream Island), a 2018 web series episode
- Enter the Exit, a 2020 EP by Shock Octopus
