= Shock Octopus =

Rock band from Perth, Western Australia

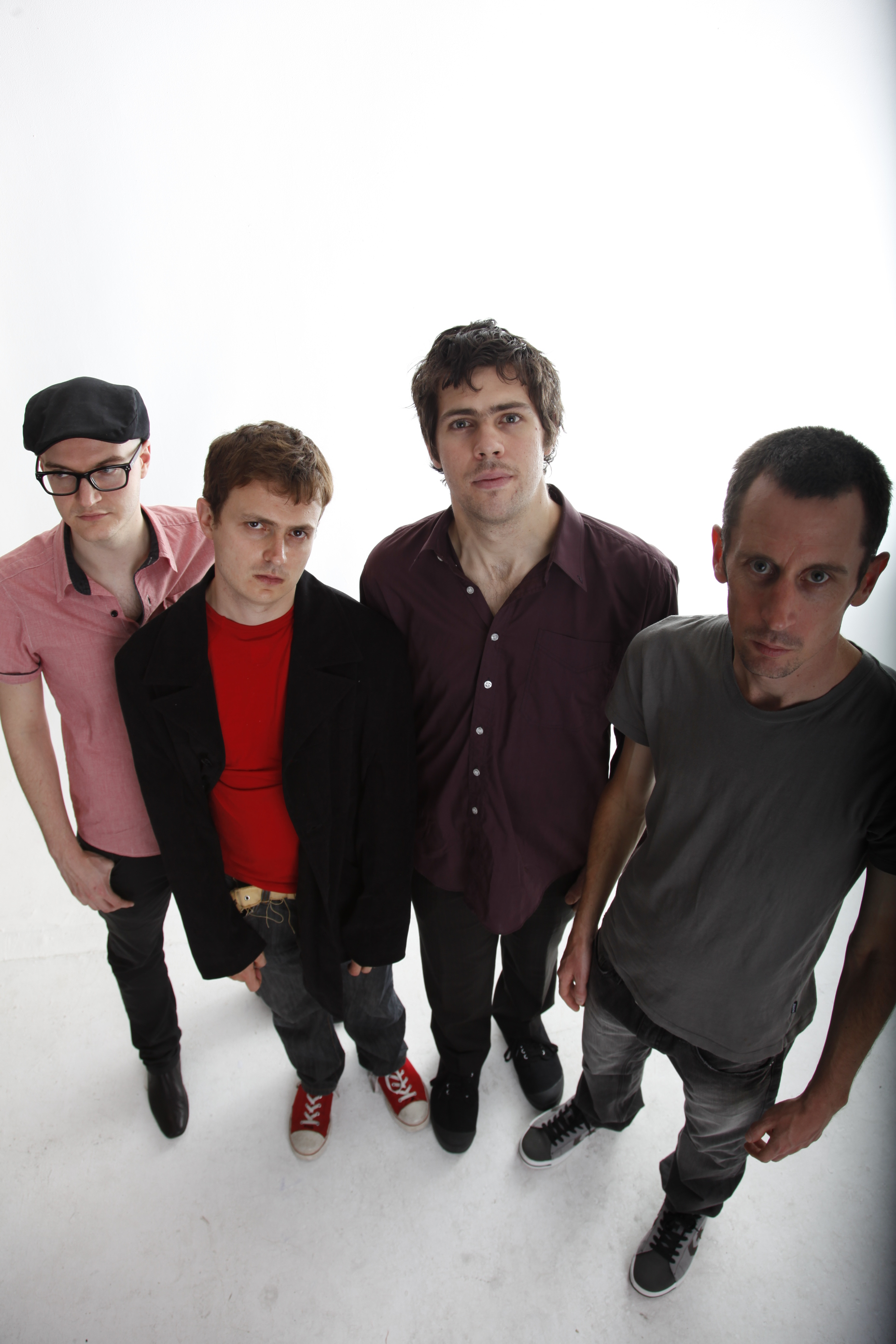
- The band in 2011. From left to right, David Sayers, Michael Bayliss, David Blair & Scott Andrews.

Background information
- Origin: Perth, Australia
- Genres: Alternative rock; Punk rock; Art rock; Psychedelic rock
- Years active: 2010–2021

Shock Octopus were an Australian rock band formed in Perth, Western Australia in 2010. The band was composed of Michael Bayliss (lead vocals, piano, keyboards), David Blair (bass, backing vocals), David Sayers (guitar), and Scott Andrews (drums). They were compared to "experimental alt-rock of the 1980s". Shock Octopus helped to progress Perth rock music by combining elements of punk, art rock, psychedelia, and pop with "songs based on environmental issues, climate grief and existential crisis". They have since been described as capturing "a broad sonic spectrum, incorporating moody piano arrangements, jangly percussion and lo-fi sensibilities".

== History ==
Bayliss and Blair met as bandmates where they were part of another Perth band called Syrian Rue. With Syrian Rue's disbandment in 2009 the duo adopted the name Counting Backwards, rejoined the Perth music scene, and recruited Sayers to commence demo-recording a series of piano-driven indie-rock songs. With the addition of Andrews, they renamed themselves Shock Octopus and played their first show on 1 January 2010. Their first professional recording, Safe Room, was released as a standalone single in June 2011 to positive reviews. They collaborated with the acclaimed Perth producer Al 'Dr Alien' Smith of Bergerk Studios on their debut EP Self-titled (2012) which blended their art rock sensibilities with influence from artists such as Talking Heads, Porcupine Tree and Kristin Hersh.

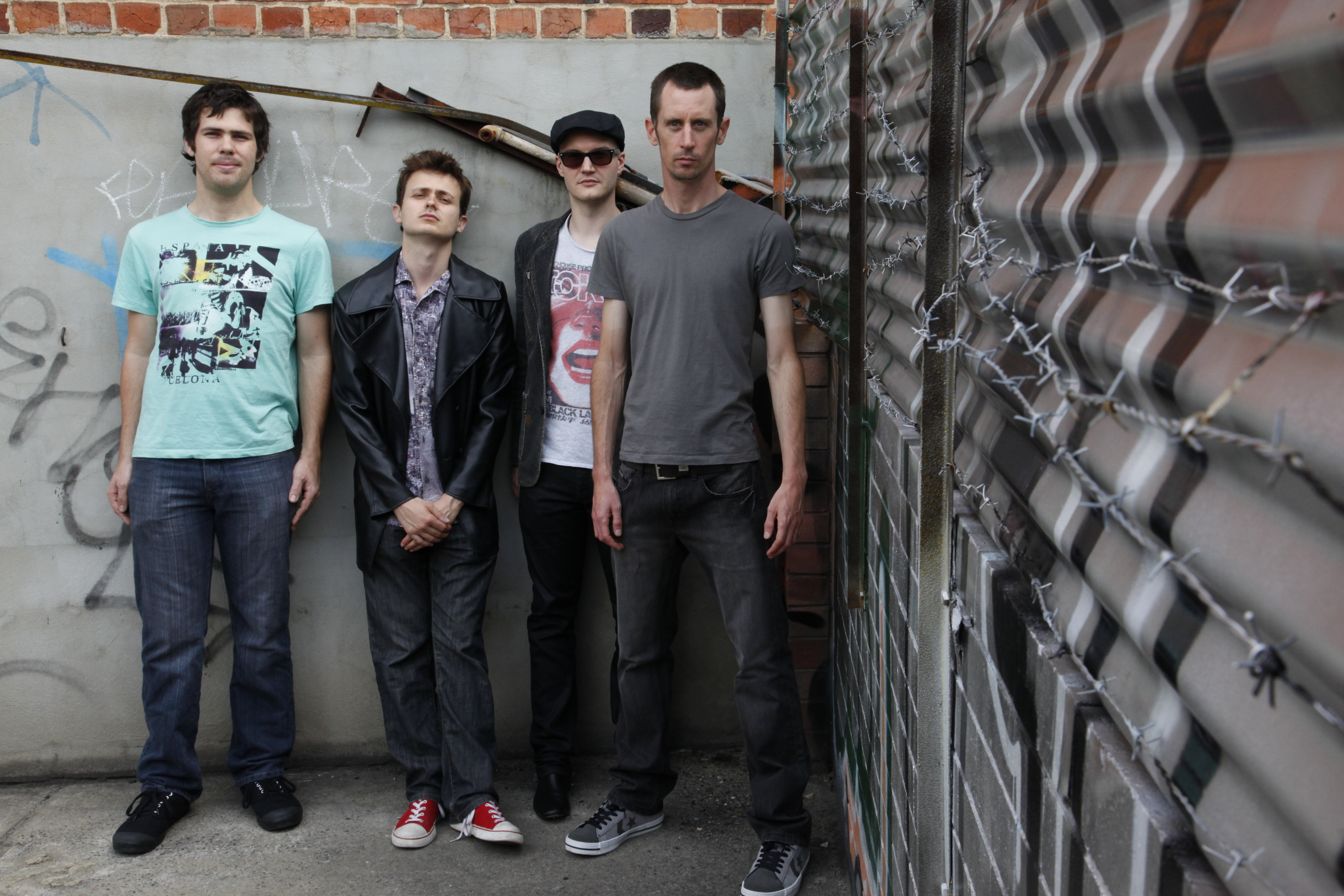
Shock Octopus, Perth, Western Australia, 2011. L-R: David Blair, Michael Bayliss, David Sayers & Scott Andrews. Photography by Craig Byrne.

Shock Octopus reached their live peak on 14 April 2012 with local Perth radio station RTR-FM publicising the launch of their seminal EP to a full-house at Ya-Ya's in Northbridge, Perth, supported by The Disappointed and Head Full of Steam. Later that year, the formative line-up of Bayliss, Blair, Sayers and Andrews played their final show in Adelaide, South Australia at Higher Ground Inc. on 14 November 2012.

With Sayers and Blair leaving the band to explore other projects (including the Sayers/Andrews stoner-doom project GOAT) the remaining members of Shock Octopus comprised Bayliss and Andrews. Together they recruited session players and forged ahead with the recording and release of the band's first full-length album entitled A Crisis (2014).

Following a successful national tour publicising the album launch, Bayliss and Andrews took a decision to reframe the style and direction of the band with a more contemplative, acoustic guitar and piano-driven sound. This departure from the band's original approach was received warmly by radio, live and online audiences alike culminating in successive EPs; Throughout the Winter (2015) and Roam in Silence (2017).

Blair returned to band activity in 2020 as the band worked to produce the third in a series of EPs. The band released Enter the Exit (2020) just prior to the advent of the COVID-19 pandemic, curtailing live performance and rehearsals. The lead single from the EP was Life on a Pier (2020).

The continued persistence of the COVID-19 pandemic led the band into an indefinite hiatus from live performance but culminated in their second full-length album, a greatest hits collection entitled A Decade into Darkness (2021) which subsequently received a series of positive online reviews in support of the album.

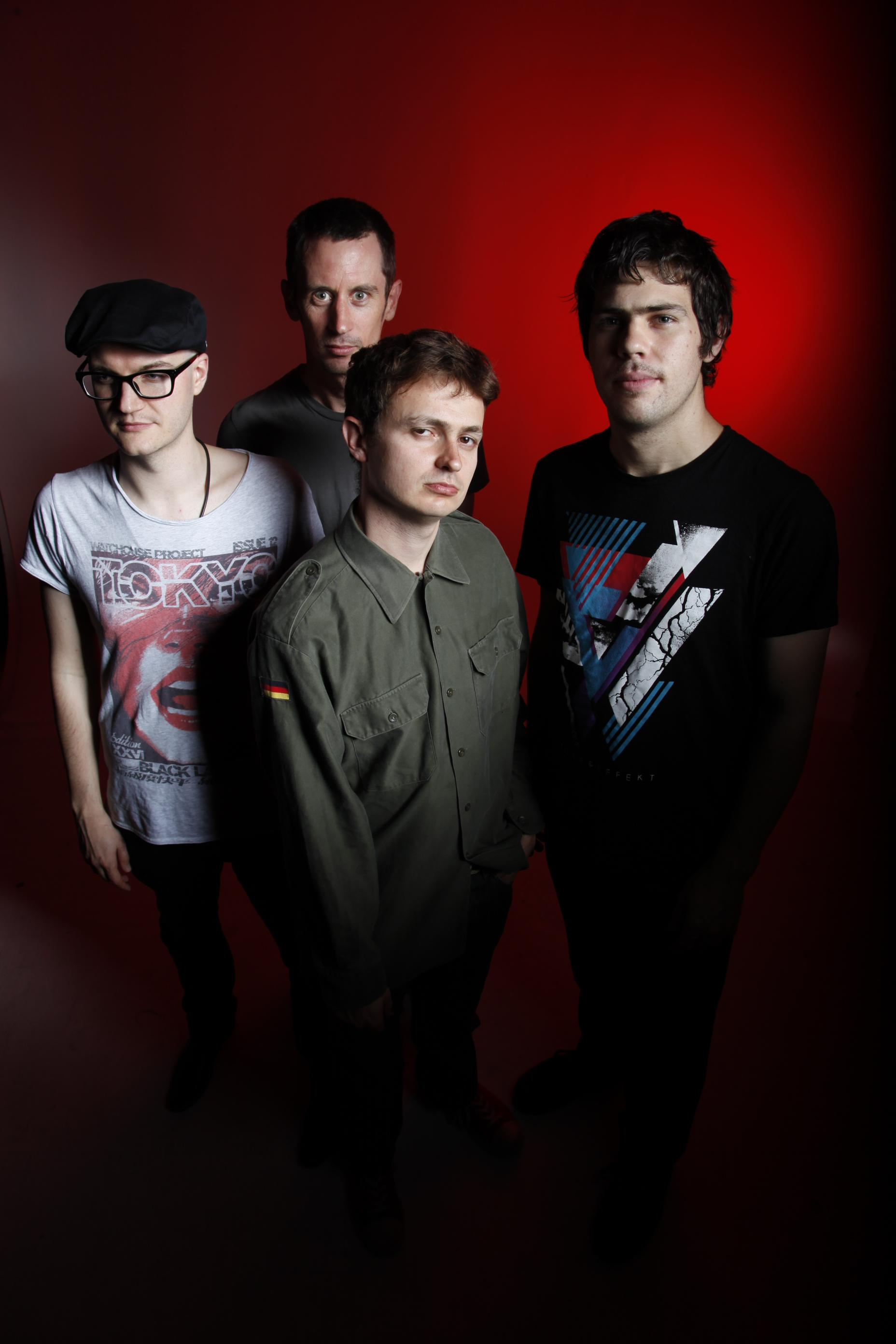
Shock Octopus, Perth, Western Australia, 2011. L-R: David Sayers, Scott Andrews, Michael Bayliss & David Blair. Photography by Craig Byrne.

== Band members ==
- Michael Bayliss – Keyboards, lead vocals
- David Blair – Bass, guitar, backing vocals
- David Sayers – Guitar
- Scott Andrews – Drums, guitar, backing vocals

=== Other crew ===
- Bill Presser – Guitar, production
- Tamara Catlin – Vocals
- Mark Allen – Songwriting, production
- Magda Wozny – Vocals
- Damien Langley – Drums
- Benji Miu – Production
- Simone Bensdorp – Artwork

== Discography ==
=== Albums ===
Title	Album details
A Crisis!	Release date: July 11, 2014; Label: Independent
A Decade into Darkness	Release date: May 29, 2021; Label: Independent

=== Extended plays ===
Title	Album details
Self-titled	Release date: 14 April 2012; Label: Independent
Throughout the Winter	Release date: November 7, 2015; Label: Independent
Roam in Silence	Release date: June 29, 2017; Label: Independent
Enter the Exit	Release date: April 3, 2020; Label: Independent

=== Singles ===
Title	Album details
Safe Room	Release date: June 17, 2011; Label: Independent
Siren	Release date: April 15, 2014; Label: Independent
The Noviciate/In a Box	Release date: May 31, 2015; Label: Independent
A Deer! Caught! In The Headlights!	Release date: May 28, 2021; Label: Independent
