= Climate Challenge =

2006 video game

- Developer: Red Redemption Ltd
- Publisher: BBC
- Platform: Browser-based
- Release: 2006
- Genre: Global warming game
- Mode: Single player

Climate Challenge is a Flash-based global warming game produced by the BBC and developed by Red Redemption. Players manage the economy and resources of the 'European Nations' as its president, while reducing emissions of CO_{2} to combat climate change and managing crises. Climate Challenge is an environmental serious game, designed to give players an understanding of the science behind climate change, as well as the options available to policy makers and the difficulties in their implementation.

== Gameplay ==
In Climate Challenge, the players take over the role of president in Europe. The game begins in 2000 and ends in 2100, where the time is divided into turns for every 10 years. Every turn, players may choose up to six policy cards to implement. The policies come from five different categories: National, Trade, Industry, Local, and Household. National policies are strategies that are implemented on the scale of entire countries, like hosting the Olympics, sending a shuttle to Mars, and creating the carbon police. Trade policies are either import or export policies of different resources and technologies, and also includes sending aid to developing countries. Industry policies include different agricultural methods and switching coal to oil. Local policies include things like rainwater use, housing regulations, and landfill power plants. Finally, household policies deal with the everyday lives of the populace, like setting emissions standards, regulating efficiency standards of household appliances, and promoting energy efficient light bulbs.

On certain points, unexpected crisis events can appear, such as floods. Every decision made has an impact on several aspects in the form of costs, environmental payoffs, and political status. The president may get voted out at any time by making the incorrect choices.

=== Resources ===
Policy cards become unavailable as resources become scarce.

A water shortage, caused by the player exhausting the water resource on the previous turn.

The four resources of the game are money, power, food, and water. Each is measured by a meter in the upper-left corner of the screen and by clicking on any individual item, a graph of the resource over time is displayed. Each turn, a red section on the grey bar shows the estimated amount by which that resource will be reduced, and a green section shows the estimated growth. These bars adjust themselves to the selected policies as they are affected. Most policy cards deplete or grow different resources, and if any of the resource bars are reduced to nothing or are entirely in the red, policy cards requiring that resource become unavailable. When a resource is exhausted by the end of the turn, the player must manage a corresponding disaster the following turn.

== Criticisms ==
Many players have complained that the mechanism the game uses to measure wealth, or the health of the economy, is very faulty and is not very realistic. According to developers, the game was meant to have a different system of measuring the health of the economy, but deadlines prevented the final version from including the more accurate system.

== See also ==
- Climate Challenge, direct link to the game.
