= An Inconvenient Sequel (book) =

2017 book by Al Gore

An Inconvenient Sequel: Truth to Power
- Author: Al Gore
- Subject: Global warming
- Publisher: Rodale Books
- Publication date: July 25, 2017
- Pages: 320
- ISBN: 978-1-63565-108-9 (paperback)
- Preceded by: Our Choice

An Inconvenient Sequel: Truth to Power: Your Action Handbook to Learn the Science, Find Your Voice, and Help Solve the Climate Crisis is a book by former Vice President and environmental activist Al Gore. It was written in conjunction with his 2017 documentary film, An Inconvenient Sequel: Truth to Power, and is a sequel to his 2006 book An Inconvenient Truth. It was published on July 25, 2017 by Rodale, Inc. in Emmaus, Pennsylvania.

The book discusses global warming, methods of reducing its impact, and climate change denial.

== Synopsis ==
The book is intended to encourage and inform readers on how they can help fight anthropogenic global warming and climate change, and is a more in-depth analysis than the film. The book describes how humans have further damaged the environment since the release of An Inconvenient Truth, and makes more predictions about what will happen in the near future if humans fail to act. The book also describes advancements that have been made so far in the effort against global warming, such as developments in alternative energy sources. The book explores other aspects of the climate crisis, such as climate change denial and the corporate influence of money in politics, and ends by reasoning that it is not too late to solve the crisis.

== Production ==
An Inconvenient Sequel was written by former Vice President Al Gore as a follow-up to his 2006 book, An Inconvenient Truth.

== Release ==
An Inconvenient Sequel was released by Rodale, Inc. on July 25, 2017, the book was released prior to the documentary of the same name.

=== Critical reception ===
Writing for the Yale Program on Climate Change Communication Michael Svobada listed the book as one of the best books on climate change.
