= Pauli effect =

Superstition that equipment only fails in the presence of certain people

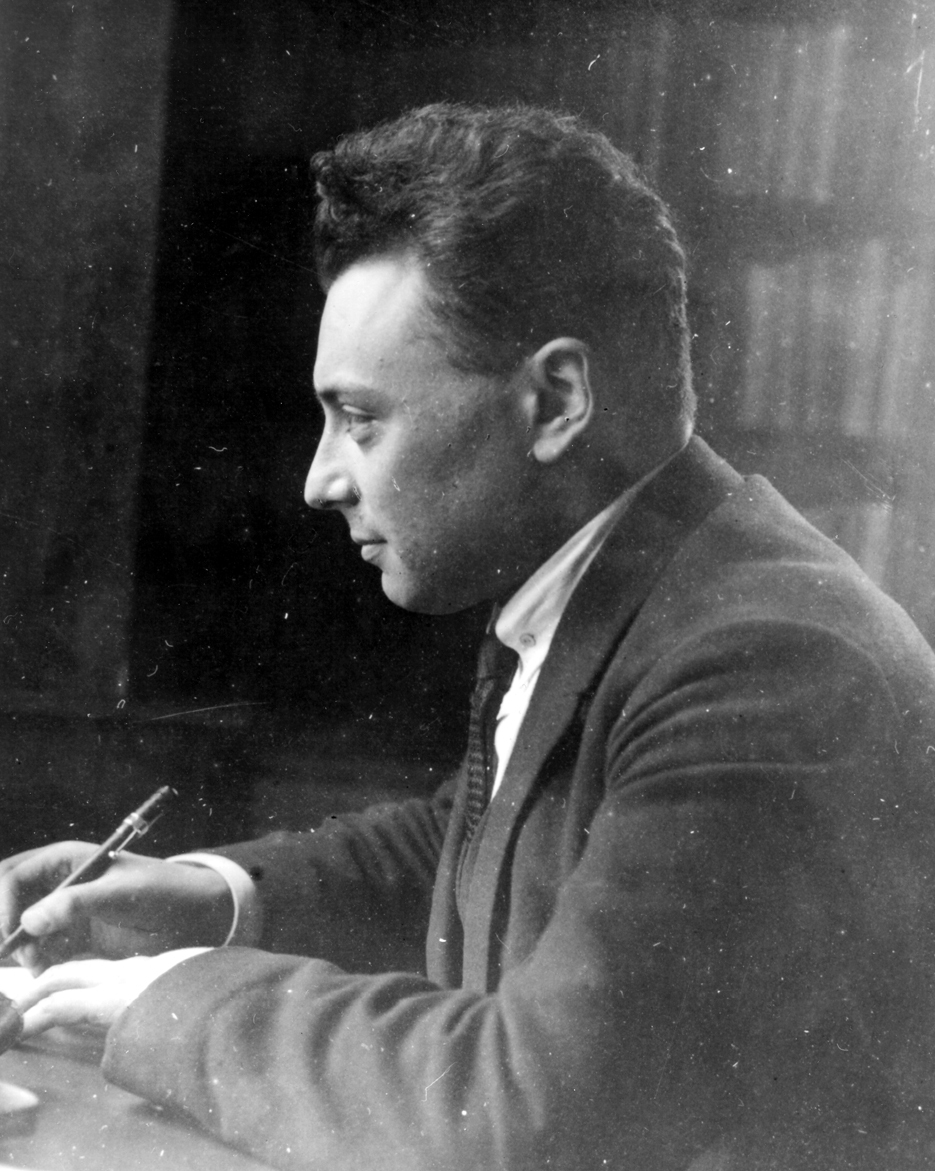
Wolfgang Pauli, c. 1924

The Pauli effect or Pauli's device corollary is the supposed tendency of technical equipment to encounter critical failure in the presence of certain people — originally, Austrian physicist Wolfgang Pauli. The Pauli effect is not related to the Pauli exclusion principle, which is a bona fide physical phenomenon named after Pauli. However the Pauli effect was humorously tagged as a second Pauli exclusion principle, according to which a functioning device and Wolfgang Pauli may not occupy the same room.

== Anecdotal evidence ==
Since the 20th century, the work in some subfields of physics research has been divided between theorists and experimentalists. Those theorists who lack an aptitude or interest in experimental work have on occasion earned a reputation for accidentally breaking experimental equipment.

While at the University of Hamburg, Wolfgang Pauli developed a reputation for affecting the outcome of physical events by his presence alone. Physicist Otto Stern became convinced that his laboratory equipment would not function correctly if Pauli were present, and asked him to keep away during important experiments. Some of his colleagues said that Pauli took this phenomenon seriously, and would sense an "unpleasant tension" before such an accident occurred.

An incident occurred in the physics laboratory at the University of Göttingen. An expensive measuring device, for no apparent reason, suddenly stopped working, although Pauli was in fact absent. James Franck, the director of the institute, reported the incident to his colleague Pauli in Zürich with the humorous remark that at least this time Pauli was innocent. However, it turned out that Pauli had been on a railway journey to Zürich and had switched trains in the Göttingen rail station at about the time of the failure. The incident is reported in George Gamow's book Thirty Years That Shook Physics, where it is also claimed the more talented the theoretical physicist, the stronger the effect.

R. Peierls describes a case when at one reception this effect was to be parodied by deliberately crashing a chandelier upon Pauli's entrance. The chandelier was suspended on a rope to be released, but it stuck instead, thus becoming a real example of the Pauli effect.

In 1934, Pauli saw a failure of his car during a honeymoon tour with his second wife as proof of a real Pauli effect since it occurred without an obvious external cause.

In February 1950, when he was at Princeton University, the cyclotron burnt, and he asked himself if this mischief belonged to such a Pauli effect, named after him.

== Reactions ==
For fear of the Pauli effect, experimental physicist Otto Stern banned Pauli from his laboratory located in Hamburg despite their friendship.

Pauli was convinced that the effect named after him was real. He corresponded with Carl Jung and Marie-Louise von Franz about the concept of synchronicity. He also corresponded with Hans Bender, lecturer at Freiburg university's Institut für Grenzgebiete der Psychologie und Psychohygiene and the only parapsychology chair in Germany.

Jung and Pauli saw some parallels between physics and depth psychology. Pauli was among the honored guests at the foundation festivities of the C.G. Jung Institute in Zürich in 1948. An example of the Pauli effect happened at the ceremony: As he entered, a china flower vase fell on the floor for no obvious reason. This incident caused Pauli to write his article "Background-Physics", in which he tries to find complementary relationships between physics and depth psychology.

== See also ==
- Feynman sprinkler
- Gore effect
- Jinx
- Streetlight effect
