= Gore effect =

Coincidental weather around Al Gore

The Gore effect or Al Gore effect is the coincidental, non-causative occurrence of unseasonably cold weather with some events associated with global warming activism, particularly those attended by former US Vice President and Presidential Candidate Al Gore. The term was coined and used, sometimes humorously, by global warming deniers.

== Usage ==
Citing the crowdsourced Urban Dictionary, Peter Scowan of The Globe and Mail reported the term as "the phenomenon that leads to unseasonably cold temperatures, driving rain, hail, or snow whenever Al Gore visits an area to discuss global warming". Erika Lovely of Politico described it as occurring when "a global warming-related event, or appearance by...Al Gore, is marked by exceedingly cold weather or unseasonably winter weather". The phenomenon was reportedly first observed in January 2004 when a speech by Gore to a global warming rally held in New York City met extremely cold winter weather; according to Andrew Bolt after another Gore speech took place on a strikingly cold day in Boston in the same year. "Climate skeptics" use the term "half-seriously" in relation to the weather conditions at global warming venues. German authors Daniel Rettig and Jochen Mai described the effect in 2012 in a popular science book about psychological mechanisms and memes, but referred to it as selective perception. CNN meteorologist Rob Marciano describes use of the effect as a mere in-joke among weather forecasters: "in the weather community, we kind of joke about it. It's just a bad timing. Every time there's some big weather climate conference, there seems to be a cold outbreak. ... But, globally, we are still warming."

Curtis Brainard of the Columbia Journalism Review has called coverage of the Gore effect "asinine", noting the distinction between short-term weather and long-term climate, while Steve Benen of the Washington Monthly called focus on the claim "insulting". Michael Daly criticized "delight in noting coincidences between events relating to [Gore's] favorite subject and severe winter weather." Environmentalist A. Siegel has called the jokes a "shallow observation" from "those who don't get that weather isn't climate". Phenomena attributed to the Gore effect are "chalked up as coincidence", according to Joe Joyce, a weather forecaster and environmental reporter. Media Matters for America quoted Patrick J. Michaels, a climate change denying climatologist and commentator with the libertarian Cato Institute in Washington with the observation that "the predictable distortion of extreme weather goes in both directions". Kalee Kreider, a spokesperson for Gore, told Erika Lovely: "As amusing as this little study sounds, we don’t think it should distract us from the reality."

== See also ==
- Pauli effect
- Synchronicity
- Ting Hai effect
- Murphy's law
