= Carbon Shift =

2009 non-fiction anthology book

Carbon Shift: How Peak Oil and the Climate Crisis Will Change Canada (and Our Lives)
- Author: Thomas Homer-Dixon with Nick Garrison, eds.
- Subject: Peak Oil and Climate Change
- Genre: Non-fiction, Environmental Science, Energy Policy
- Publisher: Vintage Canada, a division of Random House Canada
- Publication date: 2009
- Media type: Print (Hardcover & Paperback)
- Pages: 240 pp.
- ISBN: 978-0-307-35719-9 (0-307-35719-8)
- Dewey Decimal: 333.8
- LC Class: QC981.8.G56 C36 2009

Carbon Shift: How Peak Oil and the Climate Crisis Will Change Canada (and Our Lives) is a 2009 non-fiction book edited by Thomas Homer-Dixon and Nick Garrison that collects six essays that discusses the issues of peak oil and climate change. The book was first published in hardcover by Random House of Canada in 2009 under the title Carbon Shift: How the Twin Crises of Oil Depletion and Climate Change Will Define the Future, and became a national bestseller. In 2010, the paperback was published by Vintage Canada, a division of Random House Canada, the sub-title then changing to How Peak Oil and the Climate Crisis Will Change Canada (and Our Lives).

== Synopsis ==
Carbon Shift encompasses six essays by experts in the fields of economics, geology, politics, and science. The essays argue points such as humanity's potential for exhausting the supply of non-renewable fuels and what could be done to prevent this.

== Contributors ==
- Thomas Homer-Dixon - Introduction and Conclusion
- Nick Garrison - Introduction and Conclusion
- Ronald Wright - Foreword
- David Keith - Dangerous Abundance
- David Hughes - The Energy Issue: a More Urgent Problem than Climate Change
- Mark Jaccard - Peak Oil and Market Feedbacks: Chicken Little versus Dr. Pangloss
- Jeff Rubin - Demand Shift
- William Marsden - The Perfect Moment
- Jeffrey Simpson - Broken Hearts, Broken Policies: the Politics of Climate Change

== Reception ==
Quill and Quire stated that the differing outlook of the essays showed that it was "hard to imagine working together on solutions when there is so little consensus about the exact nature of the problems". Peter Robinson echoed this statement, saying that the book's essays "reinforce the conclusion that it will take all of our ingenuity, will and perseverance to prevent catastrophe." Andrew Nikiforuk praised Carbon Shift, saying that it does "a fine job of exposing Canada's big oily gamble".
