= The Climate Monologues =

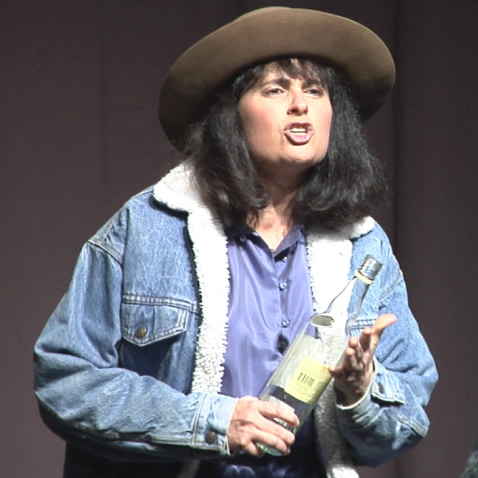
- Sharon Abreu as Hunter Lovins in The Climate Monologues, singing 'Help Me Lose a Bottle of Whiskey'
- Original language: English
- Written by: Sharon Abreu
- Characters: Robert Athickal * Lea Bossler * Abby Brockway * Katherine Egland * Ken Gale * Steve Garey * Leslie Glustrom * Maria Gunnoe * Bob Hallahan * Jewell James * Hunter Lovins * Ed Wiley
- Subject: Climate change
- Setting: Patna, India * Missoula, MT * Seattle, WA * Gulfport, MS * New York City, NY * Mount Vernon, WA * Boulder, CO * Bob White, WV * Oak Harbor, WA * Lummi Nation, WA * Rock Creek, WV

Premiere
- Date: May 16, 2010
- Place: Orcas Island Grange, Eastsound, WA
- Official website

The Climate Monologues is an episodic one-woman play, created and performed by Sharon Abreu. Inspired by The Vagina Monologues, The Climate Monologues consists of a series of monologues and original songs from the point of view of people affected by and working to prevent climate change.

The play premiered at the Orcas Island Grange in Eastsound, WA, on May 16, 2010.

On March 11, 2011, Abreu received The Spirit of Nature, Ecology and Society Environmental Justice Award. at The Culture of Climate Change colloquium at the City University of New York (CUNY) Graduate Center in New York City, for her presentation of The Climate Monologues.

Abreu performed an updated version of the show on March 27, 2016, in the Los Angeles Women's Theatre Festival.

Orcas Issues (now The Orcasonian) said in a review of a September 8, 2016, performance at Random Howse in Eastsound, WA: "Sharon Abreu is an inspired listener. She listens to the stories of West Virginian coal mining families, NW activists, Tribal leaders, Mississippi teachers, a Colorado cowgirl and Orcas’ own Lea Bossler and tells them back to us in compelling, non-scientific language about the world we live in."

Theater reviewer Lexi Orphanos wrote, "Abreu’s monologues bring a humanity to the statistics that plaster our newspapers and Facebook feeds. She doesn’t just give you the facts, she gives you a human life, bent and reshaped by environmental abuse."

A September 24, 2016, performance at the United Solo Theatre Festival sold out, was listed as a bestseller and a repeat performance was added which took place on November 18, 2016.

The play was featured in chapter 6, Orcas Island's Irthlingz: Community Art as Activism in the 2016 book, A Song to Save the Salish Sea: Musical Performance as Environmental Activism, by Mark Pedelty, published by Indiana University Press.

== Plot/Structure ==
The Climate Monologues is made up of a varying number of monologues in the voices of real people affected by or working to address climate change. Each of the monologues deals with a topic related to climate change, such as health and mountaintop removal mining, alternative energy, rail freight transport of coal and oil, and citizen activism. A recurring theme is the individual citizen taking successful action to address issues related to climate change and energy.

New monologues have been added over the years to highlight emerging issues relating to climate change. The number and order of the monologues has been varied to accommodate time limitations and dramatic considerations.
