= Our Choice =

2009 book by Al Gore

Our Choice A Plan to Solve the Climate Crisis
- Author: Al Gore
- Language: English
- Subject: Climate change
- Publisher: Rodale Books
- Publication date: November 2009
- Preceded by: An Inconvenient Truth
- Followed by: An Inconvenient Sequel

Our Choice is a 2009 book written by former U.S. Vice President Al Gore and published by Rodale, Inc. in Emmaus, Pennsylvania.

Originally titled The Path to Survival, it follows An Inconvenient Truth: The Planetary Emergency of Global Warming and What We Can Do About It, a companion book to the 2006 film An Inconvenient Truth. All profits of the book (printed on 100% recycled paper) go to the Alliance for Climate Protection, which Gore founded in 2006.

== Reception ==
In September 2009, Nature Reports Climate Change called the book one of its "Must-reads for Copenhagen". Reviewing the book for Nature Reports Climate Change, Joseph Romm described its content:

Whereas An Inconvenient Truth framed the crisis that climate negotiations are tackling, this followup spells out what needs to be done. Based on 30 of Gore's 'Solutions Summits' as well as one-on-one discussions with leading experts across multiple disciplines, the book aims, in Gore's words, "to gather in one place all of the most effective solutions that are available now". Gore naturally focuses on energy, the source of most anthropogenic greenhouse gas emissions, and discusses many underappreciated strategies such as concentrated solar thermal power and cogeneration. He also devotes a full chapter to soil, a major carbon sink that is gradually degrading. Farming strategies for restoring soil carbon are described, including biochar, a porous charcoal that can potentially enhance the soil sink while providing a source of low-carbon power. ... Our Choice is replete with lush photos and simple but powerful charts. This a must-read book for those who want a primer on all the key solutions countries will be considering at Copenhagen.

Newsweek magazine published a feature on Gore and the new book on October 31, 2009, calling it "authoritative, exhaustive, reasoned, erudite, and logical, a textbooklike march through solar and wind power, geothermal energy, biofuels, carbon sequestration, nuclear energy, the potential of forests to soak up carbon dioxide, energy efficiency, and the regulatory tangle that impedes the development of a super-efficient, continent-wide system of transmission lines.

== Nuclear power ==
Our Choice has a chapter entitled "The Nuclear Option". Gore explains that nuclear power was once "expected to provide virtually unlimited supplies of low-cost electricity", but the reality is that it has been "an energy source in crisis for the last 30 years". Worldwide growth in nuclear power has slowed in recent years, with no new reactors and an "actual decline in global capacity and output in 2008". In the United States, "no nuclear power plants ordered after 1972 have been built to completion".

== Carbon capture and storage ==
Gore explains that the idea of "carbon capture and sequestration" (CCS) seems compelling, but the reality is that "decades after CCS was first proposed, no government or company in the world has built a single commercial-scale demonstration project capturing and sequestering large amounts of carbon dioxide from a power plant".

== See also ==
- Renewable Energy Sources and Climate Change Mitigation
- Renewable energy commercialization
- Efficient energy use
- Reinventing Fire
