= Keep Cool (board game) =

German-made global warming board game

The box art for the board game

Keep Cool is a board game created by Klaus Eisenack and Gerhard Petschel-Held of the Potsdam Institute for Climate Impact Research and published by the German company Spieltrieb in November 2004. The game can be classified as both a serious game and a global warming game. In Keep Cool, up to six players representing the world's countries compete to balance their own economic interests and the world's climate in a game of negotiation. The goal of the game as stated by the authors is to "promote the general knowledge on climate change and the understanding of difficulties and obstacles, and "to make it available for a board game and still retain the major elements and processes". Empirical studies have shown that Keep Cool can facilitate experiential learning about the difficulties of international climate politics.

== Reception ==
Keep Cool sold out in four months after its release, prompting a second edition of the game to be released. The game has become very popular in Germany, and the game's creators were surprised at the success. Petschel-Held stated that "With 'Keep Cool,' we've been able to open new channels for dialogue between scientists and the public," and Eisenack commented, "Feedback has revealed surprising insights and exciting discussions about conflicts of interest in climate politics as highlights of Keep Cool." Keep Cool has been used by NGO's, schools, universities, and gaming conventions, besides being used by families and the general public. The German Federal Ministry for the Environment (BMU) has now included Keep Cool as a part of its teaching materials.

Aktivities related to KEEP COOL have been awarded various prizes: In 2016 the German Council for Sustainable Development awarded KEEP COOL mobil with the quality seal Werkstatt N. In 2017 Jasper Meya received the German Simulation and Gaming Award for his empirical study on the effectiveness of the board game KEEP COOL for teaching climate change. In 2016 and 2017 KEEP COOL mobil was awarded the Comenius-EduMedia-Siegel for educational media of particularly high didactic, content and design quality.

== Gameplay ==
=== Countries ===
The game can be played with three to six players. The countries that players will use for the game depends on the number of players, as shown in table below.

Number of players	Countries
3	USA & Partners, Europe, & Tiger Countries
4	Above + Developing Countries
5	Above + Former Soviet Union
6	Above + OPEC

Each of the countries has a distinct starting position in the game and some have special abilities/bargaining chips which can greatly affect negotiation. The United States begins the game with the most factories on the board (five black and one green) and always goes first. Europe begins with three black factories and one green, and the Tiger countries begin with two black.

The Former Soviet Union begins the game with one of each kind of factory, but has the special prerogative to demand one carbonchip from any player at the beginning of their turn. OPEC and the Developing Countries only start with one black factory each, but they both have special attributes which they can use to their advantage. OPEC receives an additional carbonchip as income for every four black factories on the game board. The Developing Countries can either add or remove up to three carbonchips to/from the carbometer from/to the chip pool.

=== Targets ===
A player needs to fulfill both their economic target and their secret target to win the game. Once both of their targets are fulfilled, the game ends, whether or not the targets are met during that player's turn. It is possible that multiple players could achieve their targets at the same time.

==== Economic targets ====
A player's economic target is met by having a certain minimum number of factories on the board. For this goal, only factories which are owned by that particular player count toward the total. This number is different for every group of countries, and it based on that group's number of starting factories and rate of growth. Players cannot receive factories from other players, but players may receive funds from other players which may go towards the cost of building new factories.

Countries	USA & Partners	Europe	Tiger Countries	Developing Countries	Former Soviet Union	OPEC
Target	12 Factories	8 Factories	5 Factories	4 Factories	5 Factories	4 Factories

==== Secret targets ====
At the beginning of the game, players are randomly dealt a card with two secret targets printed on it. Players do not share these targets with other players. Players only have to meet one of the printed secret targets, though having two to choose from allows for some flexibility in their strategy. A player may switch between strategies at any time. There are eight different secret targets in Keep Cool. All targets are minimum or maximum numbers of protection tokens, green factories, or black factories. These minimum and maximum numbers can either be global targets or G77 targets. G77 targets only count the number of game pieces in the Former Soviet Union, Developing Countries, and Tiger Countries.

Area	Maximum (global)		Minimum (global)				Minimum (G77 countries only)
Target Name	Environmentalists	Climate Skeptics	Oil Industry	New Technologies	Insurances	Economic Growth	Tech. Cooperation	Development Aid
Type	Black Factories	Green Factories	Black Factories	Green Factories	Protection Tokens	Factories (either color)	Green Factories	Protection Tokens

While there are only eight secret targets, there are eleven secret target cards, so it is very likely that at least two players in a game will have a common secret target.

=== Disasters ===
The very first thing a player does on their turn, even before the usual steps of collecting income and the rest, is draw a greenhouse card. Greenhouse cards are the random generators of disasters in Keep Cool. Most greenhouse cards are disasters which affect a particular region (consequently only one player) such as Malaria Pandemic in China or Cold Winter in Europe. Greenhouse also include rarer events, such as global disasters (e.g. Sea-level rise) and beneficial events due to global warming, like more rain in Iran. The degree of the disaster or beneficial climate event is dependent on what level of warming has occurred in the game thus far, which is measured by the carbometer. In the blue zone, many disasters and other events have little or no effect. In the yellow and orange zones, disasters are particularly more potent as well as the benefit received from positive climate changes. In the red zone, climate events are catastrophic and beneficial events from positive change are severely reduced.

== Background ==
=== Countries ===
The different coalitions of countries used in Keep Cool are based on the groups of similar interests which have emerged through the conferences held by the United Nations Framework Convention on Climate Change (UNFCCC). Throughout the various conferences of the UNFCCC, the countries belonging to the group "USA & Partners" have been generally hesitant about signing on to mandatory emissions targets and commitments. The countries of the Former Soviet Union have had emissions below the oft-cited '1990 level' for many years now, so they play a special role in emissions reduction by keeping their emissions low. The countries of the European Union have tended to have stronger commitments to reductions. The remaining groups of countries all belong to the G77. The G77 countries are divided accordingly because of their different interests, i.e. countries like China and India want to rapidly expand their industry and use their own coal, and oil-exporting countries have made no commitments to reduce emissions.

Developing countries are singled out as their own group partly because of their control of the world's rain forests. Depending on whether developing countries protect the rain forests in their lands and reforest or if they decide to clearcut in favor of expanding farmlands and industry, the developing countries can either act as another source of carbon pollution (via clearcutting) or as a carbon sink (via conservation and reforestation).

=== Factories ===
Green and black factories in Keep Cool do not correspond to any actual types of factories in reality. Instead, they are symbolic of energy generation. Green factories symbolize power generated from renewable sources like wind, sun, and biomass. Black factories represent power from non-renewable fossil fuel sources like oil and coal. In Keep Cool, the only way to truly reduce emissions is to demolish black factories.

=== Protection tokens ===
Protection tokens are meant to represent general measures to adapt to the effects of global warming. Examples include installing flood plains, building reservoirs, and constructing new buildings in areas further away from the coast. In Keep Cool, the cost of protection tokens increases upon every purchase--"Dykes cannot be raised infinitely."
