= Thin Ice (2013 film) =

2013 documentary film

Thin Ice is a 2013 documentary film following geologist Simon Lamb on a search to understand the science behind climate change. This is achieved by traveling the world and meeting a range of scientists, from biologists to physicists, who are investigating the climate. The film's conclusion emphasises the scientific consensus on human-induced climate change.

The film was a joint initiative between Oxford University and Victoria University of Wellington, and premiered around the world on Earth Day 2012, and in New Zealand in 2015.
