= Kalee Kreider =

- Amy Kalee Kreider
- Born: 1971 (age 54–55)
- Education: History
- Alma mater: Rollins College (BS)
- Employer(s): National Geographic Society; Al Gore's Office; Fenton Communications

Kalee Kreider (born 1971) is an American public affairs and environmental adviser. She is President of Ridgely Walsh, a boutique public affairs agency based in Washington, D.C. She was the Chief of Content at The National Geographic Society. She was the former environmental adviser and spokesperson for Al Gore. In this role, she helped develop the materials for An Inconvenient Truth. She is a senior adviser for the United Nations Foundation.

== Education and early career ==
Kreider was born in Columbus, Ohio. She studied history at Rollins College, which she graduated in 1992. She joined Rollins College because of Pedro Pequeño, an anthropologist. She began her career as a Truman Fellow in the Clinton Administration. She was selected as the White House Scholar-in-Residence, where she worked on the Clinton Crime Bill. She left the White House to set up a non-governmental organization called Ozone Action. She worked for Greenpeace and the National Environment Trust (now one of The Pew Charitable Trusts). During her time at Greenpeace, Kreider negotiated the Kyoto Protocol.

== Career ==
After the 2000 United States presidential election, it became obvious that the Kyoto Protocol was not going to be ratified. Kreider left climate policy, and started a position at Fenton Communications. She was recruited to Al Gore's team to help write a speech about the Iraq War.

Kreider moved to Nashville, Tennessee, where she moved in 2006 to join the Office for Al Gore. She served as Gore's environmental adviser. During this time, she researched and marketed Al Gore's best-selling books and the film An Inconvenient Truth. The work she did with Gore contributed to his Nobel Peace Prize.

In 2013 Kreider established her own consultancy, Kreider Strategies LLC. The consultancy provided information about climate change and technology. In 2019 she was made Chief of Content at the National Geographic Society, where she will lead corporate communications and public affairs.

She is a Senior Adviser for the United Nations Foundation and Vulcan Inc. She has called for more women to be involved with monitoring and mitigating climate change.

=== Personal life ===
Kreider is married to Jack Pratt, a farmer turned politician.
