= An Inconvenient Truth (book) =

2006 book by Al Gore

- Author: Al Gore
- Subject: Global warming
- Publisher: Rodale, Inc.
- Publication date: 2006
- ISBN: 1-59486-567-1
- OCLC: 69249460
- Dewey Decimal: 363.73874 22
- LC Class: QC981.8.G56 G67 2006
- Followed by: Our Choice

An Inconvenient Truth: The Planetary Emergency of Global Warming and What We Can Do About It is a 2006 book by Al Gore released in conjunction with the film An Inconvenient Truth. It is published by Rodale Press in Emmaus, Pennsylvania, in the United States.

The sequel is Our Choice: A Plan to Solve the Climate Crisis (2009).

== Summary ==
Based on Gore's lecture tour on the topic of global warming this book elaborates upon points offered in the film. The publisher of the text states that the book, "brings together leading-edge research from top scientists around the world; photographs, charts, and other illustrations; and personal anecdotes and observations to document the fast pace and wide scope of global warming."

In a section called "The Politicization of Global Warming", Al Gore stated:

As for why so many people still resist what the facts clearly show, I think, in part, the reason is that the truth about the climate crisis is an inconvenient one that means we are going to have to change the way we live our lives.

The second part of the statement beginning "... the reason is that the truth about the climate crisis..." was also highlighted and separated from the main writing in that section.

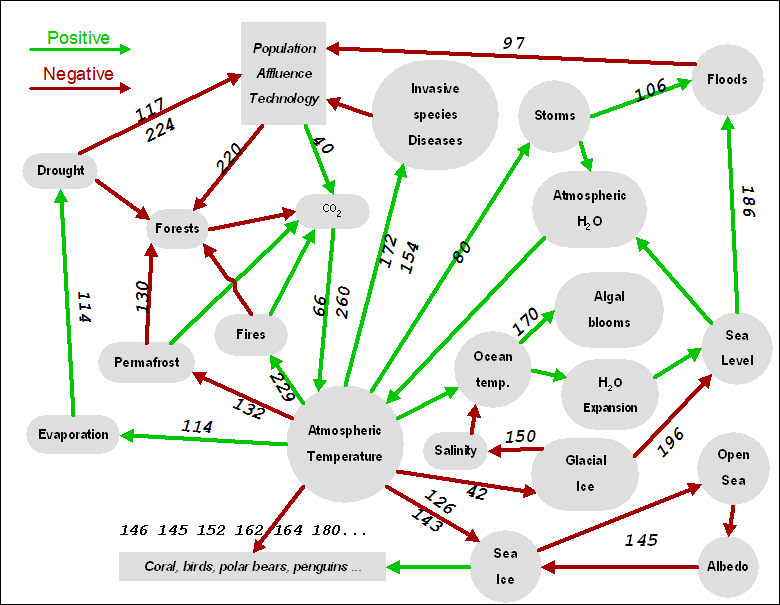
Feedback loops from AN INCONVENIENT TRUTH with page numbers from the 2006 edition.

The 2006 edition of the book has neither a table of contents nor an index, but can be summarized as the presentation of various positive and negative causal links, shown in the graphic with corresponding page numbers. A simplistic summary is that human greenhouse gas emissions drive increases in global temperature that result in changes that are detrimental to human - and many other forms of - life.

== Reception ==
Michiko Kakutani argues in The New York Times that the book's "roots as a slide show are very much in evidence. It does not pretend to grapple with climate change with the sort of minute detail and analysis" given by other books on the topic "and yet as a user-friendly introduction to global warming and a succinct summary of many of the central arguments laid out in those other volumes, "An Inconvenient Truth" is lucid, harrowing and bluntly effective."

In 2009, the audiobook version, narrated by Beau Bridges, Cynthia Nixon, and Blair Underwood, won the Grammy Award for Best Spoken Word Album.
