= An Inconvenient Truth (disambiguation) =

An Inconvenient Truth is a 2006 documentary starring Al Gore.

An Inconvenient Truth may also refer to:

- An Inconvenient Truth (book), a book by Al Gore
- An Inconvenient Truth (opera) or CO_{2}, an opera by Giorgio Battistelli based on the film
- An InCONvenient Truth, an album by Madcon
- The Inconvenient Truth, manifesto of Patrick Crusius, the perpetrator of the 2019 El Paso Walmart shooting
