= Nadolny =

Nadolny is a surname of Slavic-language origin. It may refer to:

- Burkhard Nadolny (1905–1968), German novelist
- Isabella Nadolny (1917–2004), German novelist
- Petra Nadolny (born 1960), German actor, comedy-artist and writer
- Rudolf Nadolny (1873–1953), German diplomat
- Sten Nadolny (born 1942), German novelist, son of Burkhard and Isabella Nadolny
- Stephanie Nadolny (born 1971), American voice-over artist
