= Giorgio Battistelli =

Italian composer

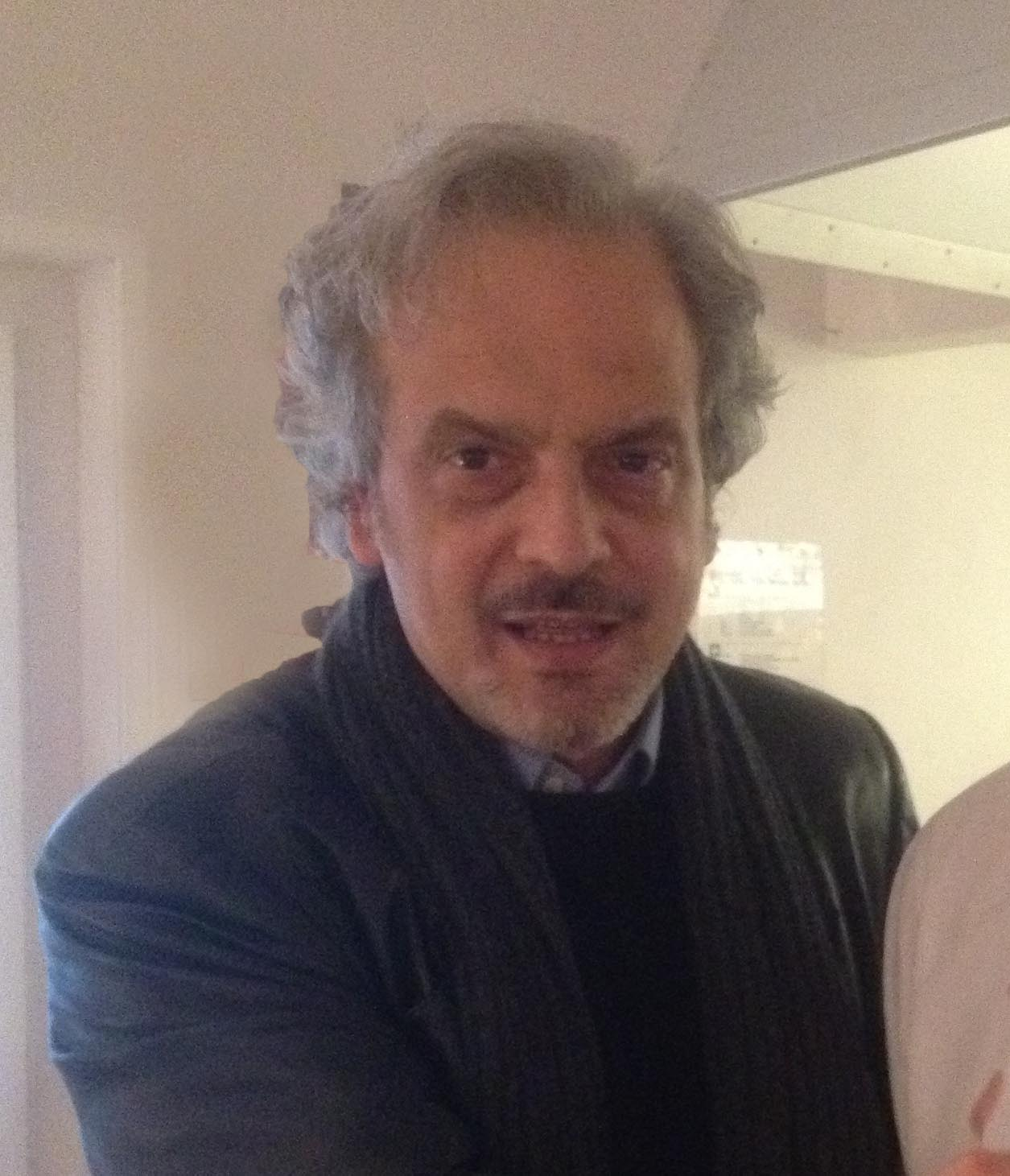
- Battistelli in 2012
- Born: 25 April 1953 (age 73); Albano Laziale, Italy
- Education: Conservatory of L'Aquila
- Occupations: Composer; Festival director
- Organizations: Cantiere Internazionale d'Arte di Montepulciano; Venice Biennale

Giorgio Battistelli (born 25 April 1953, Albano Laziale, Italy) is an Italian composer of contemporary classical music.

== Early life and education ==
Giorgio Battistelli studied at the conservatory in L'Aquila, and is a former student of Stockhausen and Kagel.

== Career ==
By 2009, Battistelli had written nearly 20 operas, on subjects ranging from Diderot and d'Alembert's Encyclopaedia to Mary Shelley's Frankenstein.

From 1985 to 1986 he was host of the Deutscher Akademischer Austauschdienst in Berlin. In 1994 he co-founded an improvisation group called Edgard Varèse, and an instrumental ensemble named Beat '72.

In October 2009, his opera Miracle in Brisbane was performed for the Brisbane Festival in Brisbane, Australia, directed by Rhoda Roberts and starring an Aboriginal and Torres Strait Islander cast, including Aaron Fa'aoso, Deborah Mailman, Djakapurra Munyarrayan, and Casey Donovan.

In November 2009 he was artistic director of the Jerwood Opera Writing Programme hosted by Aldeburgh Music in England.

His opera CO2, based on Al Gore's An Inconvenient Truth, premiered at La Scala opera house in Milan in 2015.

Battistelli's opera Wake was premiered by the Birmingham Opera Company in March 2018 and is inspired by the story of Lazarus being brought back from the dead.

He was artistic director of the Cantiere Internazionale d'Arte di Montepulciano, the Orchestra Regionale Toscana.

He has been director of the music section of the Venice Biennale.

His music is published by Ricordi and recordings available on Stradivarius.

== Recognition and awards ==
In 1990 Battistelli won the SIAE award for an opera, and in 1993 the Cervo Prize for contemporary music.

He was awarded the Knight Grand Cross of the Order of Merit of the Italian Republic on 27 December 2020.

== Stage works ==
Title	Format	Libretto and source	Premiere
Experimentum Mundi	Opera di musica immaginistica, 60'	the composer, after the Encyclopédie of Diderot and D'Alembert	May 1981; Teatro Olimpico, Rome
Linzer Stahloper			Sep 1982; Hauptplatz, Linz
Jules Verne	Fantasia da camera, 60'		Sep 1987; Strasbourg
Aphrodite	Monodramma di costumi antichi, 50'	after the novel Aphrodite: mœurs antiques by Pierre Louÿs	Jul 1988; Villa Massimo, Rome
Combattimento di Ettore e Achille	Représentation de corps et de mémoire, 60'	the composer, after texts of Homer, Tirso de Molina, Goethe, Schiller, Shakespeare, Du Bellay, Racine, Stazio, Quintus, Monti, Leopardi, Foscolo, Chiabrera, Ariosto, Catullo, Ronsard, Valéry	Sep 1989; Festival Musica, Strasbourg
Keplers Traum	Kammeroper, 60'	the composer, loosely after Kepler	Sep 1990; Brucknerhaus, Linz
Teorema	Parabola in musica in 2 atti (16 scene), 70'	the composer, loosely after the film by Pier Paolo Pasolini	Mar 1992; Teatro Comunale, Maggio Musicale Fiorentino
Frau Frankenstein	Monodramma del Prometeo moderno, 35'	the composer, after Mary Shelley	Mar 1993; Berliner Festspiele
Prova d’Orchestra	Teatro di musica		Nov 1995; Strasbourg
The Cenci	Music theatre	the composer and Nick Ward, after the setting by Antonin Artaud of the verse drama by Shelley	Jul 1997; Almeida Opera Festival, London
Die Entdeckung der Langsamkeit	Musiktheater in 5 scenes, 70'	Michael Klügl, after the novel by Sten Nadolny	Oct 1997; Theater Bremen
Impressions d'Afrique	Music theatre	Lavaudant and Loayza, after texts by Roussel, Blake, Dickens, Morgenstern, Rabelais, Saba, Tasso	May 2000; Teatro Goldoni/ Maggio Musicale Fiorentino
Auf den Marmorklippen	Musikalische visionen, 100'	Giorgio van Straten and the composer, after the novel by Ernst Jünger	Mar 2002; Nationaltheater Mannheim
The Embalmer	Monodramma giocoso da camera, 70'	Renzo Rosso	Jul 2002; Almeida Opera Festival, London
Der Herbst des Patriarchen	Opera in 6 scenes, 110'	Gotthart Kuppel, after El otoño del patriarca by Gabriel García Márquez	Jun 2004; Theater Bremen
Richard III	Dramma musicale in 2 acts, 150'	Ian Burton, after the play by Shakespeare	Jan 2005; Flemish Opera, Antwerp
Miracolo a Milano	Music theatre, 90'	the composer, loosely after the novel Totò il buono by Cesare Zavattini and its film adaption Miracolo a Milano by Vittorio De Sica	Nov 2007; Teatro Valli, Reggio Emilia
The Fashion	Opera Mondana in 12 scenes, 90'	Bob Goody	Jan 2008; Deutsche Oper am Rhein, Düsseldorf
Divorzio all'Italiana	Azione musicale in 23 tavole per il crepuscolo della famiglia, 90'	the composer, loosely after the film by Pietro Germi	Sep 2008; Opéra national de Lorraine, Nancy, France
Miracle in Brisbane			October 2009; Brisbane Festival, Australia
CO_{2}	Opera, 90'	Ian Burton, Sung in English with electronic libretto in Italian, English	May 2015; La Scala, Milan
Il Medico dei Pazzi	Opera		2016; Opéra national de Lorraine, Nancy
Lot	Opera		2017; Staatsoper Hannover
Wake	Opera	Sarah Woods	March 2018; Birmingham Opera Company
