= Philip Stott =

British biogeographer (born 1945)

Philip Stott (born England, 1945) is a professor emeritus of biogeography at the School of Oriental and African Studies, University of London, and a former editor (1987–2004) of the Journal of Biogeography.

== Background ==
In the early 1970s, Stott and his wife, a historian and biographer, lived in Thailand and he was carrying out field research at Kalasin. He has two daughters.

He has written academic papers and books on chalk grassland, on the vegetation and archaeology of Thailand (and on the rest of southeast Asia), on ecology and biogeography (e.g. his textbook 'Historical Plant Geography'), on fire ecology on lichens and mosses, on tropical rain forest and on the construction of environmental knowledge.

He was chairman of The Anglo-Thai Society (2003–2007), UK. He is no longer a member of the Scientific Alliance because he deems it important to be academically independent of all organisations, industry, and green groups.

== Media ==
He writes for the press, especially for The Times, and broadcasts regularly on BBC radio and television on subjects including biogeography, extinction, climatology, and ecology.

He hosted a number of websites including pro-biotech supporting genetically modified foods, another countering 'ecohype and later 'envirospin', and one based on Bruno Latour's 'A Parliament of Things'.

Stott was often on Talksport with James Whale talking about Global Warming in his regular evening show. He appeared on "The Great Global Warming Swindle" on Channel 4 and presented several issues of 'Home Planet' on BBC Radio 4 (2009-2011).

In June 2008 he was a guest on Private Passions, the biographical music discussion programme on BBC Radio 3.

== Published works ==
- Royal Siamese Maps: War and Trade in Nineteenth Century Thailand (River Books and Thames & Hudson: 2005), for H.R.H. Princess Sirindhorn (with Santanee Phasuk)
- Global environmental change (Blackwell Science: largely on climate change) (with Dr. Peter Moore and Professor Bill Chaloner)
- Political ecology: science, myth and power (Edward Arnold; Oxford USA) (edited with Dr. Sian Sullivan).

He has also published four books of recorder music for children and recorder consorts, and he used to conduct an Early Music Consort called 'Pifaresca'. His Sinfonia Concertante for Clarinet in B flat is available for download, along with other compositions, and the full orchestral score from Finale Showcase.

== Views ==
=== Global warming ===
Stott regards himself as a Humeian 'mitigated sceptic' on the subject of global warming. He has not published scholarly articles in the field of climate change, although he has published books on the subject.

Stott has been critical of terms like 'climate sceptic' and 'climate change denier'; he believes in a distinction between the science of climate change and what he asserts is the Barthesian myth of global warming,

Stott is also critical of organizations like the IPCC. In a letter published in The Daily Telegraph (June 10, 2005), he claimed that climate is not changing, that humans are not influencing climate change, and that humans cannot manipulate climate predictably, contradicting the scientific consensus on climate change on all of these issues.

=== Energy policy ===
Stott's "alternative Charter for a sound energy policy" begins with (what) we need are strong economies that can adapt to climate change and he proposes that the Kyoto Protocol be dropped because of "[I]ts ‘command-and-control’ economics which have no chance of working in the face of world economic growth, especially in the developing world.". He believes that the Kyoto Protocol is moribund politically . Stott is concerned that the UK is failing to address its core energy needs, which must involve a mix of clean coal, gas, and probably nuclear power. Stott also encourages development of energy infrastructure in the developing world. He sees the alleviation of energy poverty, along with the need for clean water, as two of the most urgent world issues He regards most renewables as helpful (although he is critical of wind power), but only marginal to the core requirements of an advanced society.

=== Deforestation in the Amazon ===
Stott contested the research of a report in 2001 that predicted that by 2020 the forest would be 42% deforested.

"New research in Brazil suggests that around 87.5% of the previously mapped area of the Amazon remains largely intact and, of the 12.5% that has been deforested, one-third to one-half is fallow or in the process of regeneration," he said.

"This lungs of the earth business is nonsense; the daftest of all theories"

As of 2022, research showed around 13.2% of the original forest lost, but 31% in the Eastern Amazon.

Stott teamed up with Patrick Moore in 2000 and made several appearances deposing deforestation research.

"One of the simple, but very important, facts is that the rainforests have only been around for between 12,000 and 16,000 years. That sounds like a very long time but, in terms of the history of the earth, it's hardly a pinprick. Before then, there were hardly any rainforests. They are very young. It is just a big mistake that people are making."

This is in opposition to the accepted view that e.g. the Amazon rain forest has been in existence for at least 55 million years.
