= Dimmock v Secretary of State for Education and Skills =

2007 UK legal case

Dimmock v Secretary of State for Education and Skills was a case heard in September–October 2007 in the High Court of Justice of England and Wales, concerning the permissibility of the government providing Al Gore's climate change documentary An Inconvenient Truth to English state schools as a teaching aid.

The case was brought by Stewart Dimmock, a lorry (HGV) driver and school governor from Kent, England, a father of two sons who attend a state school. Dimmock has twice stood as a local election candidate for the New Party and received backing for the case from Viscount Monckton, the author of the New Party's manifesto. Monckton, one of the UK's most prominent climate change deniers, launched an advertising campaign against Al Gore in March 2007 challenging Gore to a public debate on climate change. Monckton has received funding from a Washington-based conservative think tank of which he is chief policy adviser, the Science and Public Policy Institute (SPPI), to create a film, Apocalypse No, which will parody Gore, showing Monckton presenting a slide show making an attack on climate change science.

The plaintiff sought to prevent the educational use of An Inconvenient Truth on the grounds that schools are legally required to provide a balanced presentation of political issues. The court ruled that the film was substantially founded upon scientific research and fact and could continue to be shown, but it had a degree of political bias such that teachers would be required to explain the context via guidance notes issued to schools along with the film. The court also identified nine of what the plaintiff called 'errors' in the film which were departures from the scientific mainstream, and ruled that the guidance notes must address these items specifically.

== Background to the case ==
In October 2006, the Government announced that the academic year 2006/07 would be a "Sustainable Schools Year of Action" to promote sustainable development and environmental consciousness. This followed an earlier public consultation on a Sustainable Schools Strategy. As part of the strategy, schools throughout the UK were to be given guidance and educational material on current environmental issues.

Ross Finnie, the Environment Minister of the Scottish Executive, announced on 16 January 2007 that An Inconvenient Truth would be shown to all secondary school pupils in Scotland, with the costs being underwritten by the energy company ScottishPower. The Department for Education and Skills (DfES) followed suit on 2 February with an announcement that a copy of the film would be sent to all 3,385 secondary schools in England. A month later, the Welsh Assembly Government likewise announced that schools and colleges in Wales would receive a copy of the film. In all three countries, the distribution of the film was accompanied by guidance notes and resources on how climate change fits into the context of the National Curriculum and the Sustainable Schools Year of Action programme. The DVD was also accompanied in English schools by a multimedia CD produced by the Department for Environment, Food and Rural Affairs which included two short films about climate change and an animation about the carbon cycle.

The move was opposed by a group of parents in the New Forest region of Hampshire, who argued that the film was "inaccurate and politically motivated" and threatened to take legal action against the Government. The parents' spokesman, Conservative councillor Derek Tipp, asserted that the circulation of the film by the Government amounted to political indoctrination and was in breach of the Education Act 2002.

== The court case ==
The film's distribution was also opposed by Christopher Monckton, 3rd Viscount Monckton of Brenchley, a prominent British global warming denier. According to Monckton, he "identified three dozen scientific errors in it" and prompted an unnamed wealthy friend "to do something to fight back against this tide of unscientific freedom-destroying nonsense". Funding for litigation was provided by the friend, and when the government "didn't reply satisfactorily", Monckton and his colleagues served papers on the government. The case was brought in May 2007 in the name of Stewart Dimmock, a truck driver and governor at a school in Dover, Kent, who was also a member of the same small political party for which Monckton had written a manifesto. In papers lodged at the High Court in London, the plaintiffs argued that showing the film would violate section 406(1)(b) of the Education Act 1996. The Act requires that local education authorities, school governing bodies and head teachers "shall forbid... the promotion of partisan political views in the teaching of any subject in the school". Alternatively, the plaintiffs submitted, showing the film was unlawful because it did not provide "a balanced presentation of opposing views" as required by section 407. Dimmock petitioned the court to enjoin the Government from showing An Inconvenient Truth in English schools. Although he did not publicly explain his motivation, he was reported to feel "very strongly that this is an attempt to brainwash children with flawed science." The behind-the-scenes role of Monckton and the other global warming deniers was disclosed much later, in an interview given by Monckton to the conservative American talk show host Glenn Beck in March 2008.

The initial written application to challenge the Government was refused in July 2007. On 27 September 2007, however, permission was granted at an oral hearing with a three-day judicial review before Justice Michael Burton following immediately thereafter.

Dimmock's counsel asserted that the film was "partisan, aimed at influencing rather than informing, and lacked balance", and that it contained "serious scientific inaccuracies, political propaganda and sentimental mush." The court was told that Dimmock had been widely supported by "[l]ots of parents [who] have written to him supporting his application. They do not want our children brainwashed in this way by the New Labour Thought Police."

In response, the Government's counsel said that the guidance notes that accompanied the DVD of An Inconvenient Truth meant that the overall package was politically balanced. Teachers could present the film in any way they wished but could provide balance by explaining to pupils that some of Gore's views were political and asking them for their views. The Government offered to modify the guidance notes to meet specific scientific concerns. On the last day of the hearing, 2 October, the judge announced that he would be saying in his formal written judgment that the film did promote "partisan political views" and teachers would have to inform pupils that there were other opinions on global warming and they should not necessarily accept the views of the film. However, he stated that "I will be declaring that, with the guidance as now amended, it will not be unlawful for the film to be shown."

== The judgment ==
Justice Burton's written judgment was released on 10 October 2007. He found that it was clear that the film "is substantially founded upon scientific research and fact, albeit that the science is used, in the hands of a talented politician and communicator, to make a political statement and to support a political programme." The necessary amendments made to the related guidance notes make it clear what the mainstream view is, insofar as the film departs from it. The notes also explain that there are views of deniers who do not accept the consensus reached by the Intergovernmental Panel on Climate Change. Given these amendments, the judge considered that the film was put in a context in which a balanced presentation of opposing views was offered and where it could be shown to students in compliance with the law. Given a proper context, the requirement for a balanced presentation did not warrant that equal weight be given to alternative views of a mainstream view.

The judge concluded "I have no doubt that Dr Stott, the Defendant's expert, is right when he says that: 'Al Gore's presentation of the causes and likely effects of climate change in the film was broadly accurate.'" On the basis of testimony from Dr. Robert M. Carter and the arguments put forth by the claimant's lawyers, the judge also pointed to nine of the statements that Dimmock's counsel had described as "errors" as inaccuracies; i.e., that were not representative of the mainstream. He also found that some of these statements arose in the context of supporting Al Gore's political thesis. The judge required that the guidance notes should address these statements.

=== The nine inaccuracies ===
The judge described nine statements by Gore as departures from the scientific mainstream. However, Al Gore's spokesman has disputed this characterisation of the nine statements, which were as follows:

1. Sea level rise of up to 20 feet (7 metres) will be caused by melting of either West Antarctica or Greenland.
  - Gore's view: "If Greenland broke up and melted, or if half of Greenland and half of West Antarctica broke up and melted, this is what would happen to the sea level in Florida. This is what would happen in the San Francisco Bay. A lot of people live in these areas. The Netherlands, the Low Countries: absolutely devastating. The area around Beijing is home to tens of millions of people. Even worse, in the area around Shanghai, there are 40 million people. Worse still, Calcutta, and to the east Bangladesh, the area covered includes 50 million people. Think of the impact of a couple of hundred thousand refugees when they are displaced by an environmental event and then imagine the impact of a hundred million or more. Here is Manhattan. This is the World Trade Center memorial site. After the horrible events of 9/11 we said never again. This is what would happen to Manhattan. They can measure this precisely, just as scientists could predict precisely how much water would breach the levee in New Orleans."
  - Justice Burton's view: "This is distinctly alarmist, and part of Mr Gore's 'wake-up call'. It is common ground that if indeed Greenland melted, it would release this amount of water, but only after, and over, millennia, so that the Armageddon scenario he predicts, insofar as it suggests that sea level rises of 7 metres might occur in the immediate future, is not in line with the scientific consensus."
  - Other scientific views: Gore does not say that the sea level would rise 7 metres in the immediate future, though he says that such a rise is a possibility (without specifying the timeframe). The IPCC Fourth Assessment Report predicts that the sea level could rise up to 59 cm by 2100, but excludes any effects from melting in Greenland and Antarctica because of the scientific uncertainties in predicting that scenario. While many scientists believe that neither land mass will melt significantly in the next century, NASA climatologist James E. Hansen has predicted a major increase in sea level on the order of several metres by the end of the 21st century.
2. Low-lying islands in the Pacific Ocean are having to be evacuated because of the effects of global warming.
  - Gore's view: "[T]hat's why the citizens of these Pacific nations have all had to evacuate to New Zealand."
  - Justice Burton's view: "There is no evidence of any such evacuation having yet happened."
  - Other scientific views: The inhabitants of the Carteret Islands in Papua New Guinea announced in 2005 that they would evacuate the islands and move to the much larger Bougainville Island, as their homeland was expected to be submerged by 2015. The cause of the islands' submersion is a matter of debate; a United Nations official suggested that a local fishing practice of destroying reefs with dynamite might be responsible.
3. The Gulf Stream would be shut down by global warming, causing sharp cooling in northwest Europe.
  - Gore's view: "One of the [scenarios] they are most worried about where they have spent a lot of time studying the problem is the North Atlantic, where the Gulf Stream comes up and meets the cold wind coming off the Arctic over Greenland and evaporates the heat out of the Gulf Stream and the stream is carried over to western Europe by the prevailing winds and the earth's rotation ... they call it the Ocean Conveyor. At the end of the last ice age … that pump shut off and the heat transfer stopped and Europe went back into an ice age for another 900 or 1,000 years. Of course that's not going to happen again, because glaciers of North America are not there. Is there any big chunk of ice anywhere near there? Oh yeah. [points at Greenland]"
  - Justice Burton's view: "According to the IPCC, it is very unlikely that the Ocean Conveyor (known technically as the Meridional Overturning Circulation or thermohaline circulation) will shut down in the future, though it is considered likely that thermohaline circulation may slow down."
  - Other scientific views: A group of 12 climatologists was surveyed on this question in 2006 by Kirsten Zickfeld of the University of Victoria, Canada. Assuming a temperature rise of 4 °C (7.2 °F) by 2100, eight of them assessed the probability of thermohaline circulation collapse as significantly above zero; three estimated a probability of 40% or higher.
4. There was an exact fit between graphs showing changes in carbon dioxide levels in the atmosphere and global temperatures over a period of 650,000 years.
  - Gore's view: "In all of this time, 650,000 years, the CO_{2} level has never gone above 300 parts per million. ... The relationship is very complicated. But there is one relationship that is more powerful than all the others and it is this. When there is more carbon dioxide, the temperature gets warmer, because it traps more heat from the sun inside."
  - Justice Burton's view: "Mr Gore shows two graphs relating to a period of 650,000 years, one showing rise in CO_{2} and one showing rise in temperature, and asserts (by ridiculing the opposite view) that they show an exact fit. Although there is general scientific agreement that there is a connection, the two graphs do not establish what Mr Gore asserts."
  - Other scientific views: Global warming episodes at the end of ice ages have not been triggered by rises in atmospheric CO_{2}. However, this does not disprove the proposition that CO_{2} warms the atmosphere and that rising emissions of CO_{2} are the principal cause of global warming today.
5. The disappearance of snow on Mount Kilimanjaro in Tanzania was due to global warming.
  - Gore's view: "And now we're beginning to see the impact in the real world. This is Mount Kilimanjaro more than 30 years ago, and more recently. And a friend of mine just came back from Kilimanjaro with a picture he took a couple of months ago."
  - Justice Burton's view: "Mr Gore asserts in scene 7 that the disappearance of snow on Mt Kilimanjaro is expressly attributable to global warming. It is noteworthy that this is a point that specifically impressed Mr Miliband (see the press release quoted at paragraph 6 above). However, it is common ground that, the scientific consensus is that it cannot be established that the recession of snows on Mt Kilimanjaro is mainly attributable to human-induced climate change."
  - Other scientific views: A 2006 study by a group at the University of Innsbruck concluded that "rather than changes in 20th century climate being responsible for [the glaciers'] demise, glaciers on Kilimanjaro appear to be remnants of a past climate that was once able to sustain them."
6. The shrinkage of Lake Chad in Africa was caused by global warming.
  - Gore's view: "This is Lake Chad, once one of the largest lakes in the world. It has dried up over the last few decades to almost nothing."
  - Justice Burton's view: The drying up of Lake Chad is used as a prime example of a catastrophic result of global warming. However, it is generally accepted that the evidence remains insufficient to establish such an attribution. It is apparently considered to be far more likely to result from other factors, such as population increase and over-grazing, and regional climate variability.
  - Other scientific views: A NASA study released in 2001 concluded that Lake Chad's shrinkage resulted from a combination of irrigation demands and climate change: "Using model and climate data, Coe and Foley calculate that a 30% decrease took place in the lake between 1966 and 1975. Irrigation only accounted for 5% of that decrease, with drier conditions accounting for the remainder. They noticed that irrigation demands increased four-fold between 1983 and 1994, accounting for 50% of the additional decrease in the size of the lake."
7. Hurricane Katrina was likewise caused by global warming.
  - Gore's view: "And then of course came Katrina. It is worth remembering that when it hit Florida it was a Category 1, but it killed a lot of people and caused billions of dollars worth of damage. And then, what happened? Before it hit New Orleans, it went over warmer water. As the water temperature increases, the wind velocity increases and the moisture content increases. And you'll see Hurricane Katrina form over Florida. And then as it comes into the Gulf over warm water it becomes stronger and stronger and stronger. Look at that Hurricane's eye. And of course the consequences were so horrendous; there are no words to describe it. ... There had been warnings that hurricanes would get stronger. There were warnings that this hurricane, days before it hit, would breach the levies and cause the kind of damage that it ultimately did cause."
  - Justice Burton's view: "In scene 12 Hurricane Katrina and the consequent devastation in New Orleans is ascribed to global warming. It is common ground that there is insufficient evidence to show that."
  - Other scientific views: The World Meteorological Organization explains that "though there is evidence both for and against the existence of a detectable anthropogenic signal in the tropical cyclone climate record to date, no firm conclusion can be made on this point." They also clarified that "no individual tropical cyclone can be directly attributed to climate change."
8. Polar bears were being found drowned after having to swim long distances to find the (melting) ice.
  - Gore's view: "That's not good for creatures like polar bears that depend on the ice. A new scientific study shows that for the first time they're finding polar bears that have actually drowned, swimming long distances up to 60 miles to find the ice. They did not find that before."
  - Justice Burton's view: "The only scientific study that either side before me can find is one which indicates that four polar bears have recently been found drowned because of a storm. That is not to say that there may not in the future be drowning-related deaths of polar bears if the trend continues."
  - Other scientific views: The study in question is a September 2004 paper in Polar Biology which describes the unprecedented discovery of four drowned polar bears in the Beaufort Sea off Alaska. The paper's lead author "doubts this was simply the result of exhaustion from having to swim further from ice to shore. More likely, weather conditions are becoming more severe in the growing expanses of open water, making swimming more difficult."
9. Coral reefs were being bleached by the effects of global warming and other factors.
  - Gore's view: "Coral reefs all over the world because of global warming and other factors are bleaching and they end up like this. All the fish species that depend on the coral reef are also in jeopardy as a result. Overall species loss is now occurring at a rate 1,000 times greater than the natural background rate."
  - Justice Burton's view: "The actual scientific view, as recorded in the IPCC report, is that, if the temperature were to rise by 1–3°C, there would be increased coral bleaching and widespread coral mortality, unless corals could adopt [sic] or acclimatise, but that separating the impacts of climate change-related stresses from other stresses, such as over-fishing and polluting, is difficult."
  - Other scientific views: The most recent IPCC report does indeed state that most corals would bleach if temperatures rose more than 1 °C over levels in the 1980s and 1990s. With the current rate of increase, further coral bleaching is considered highly likely. The rise in temperatures is also increasing the incidence of disease in corals, accelerating the rate of bleaching.

== Responses to the judgment ==
The Minister of Children, Young People and Families, Kevin Brennan, declared the outcome a victory for the government, stating: "We have updated the accompanying guidance, as requested by the judge to make it clearer for teachers as to the stated Intergovernmental Panel on Climate Change position on a number of scientific points raised in the film."

Mr Justice Burton declared the case a victory for the claimant stating "I conclude that the claimant substantially won this case by virtue of my finding that, but for the new guidance note, the film would have been distributed in breach of sections 406 and 407 of the 1996 Education Act".

A spokesman for Al Gore stated that, "Of the thousands of facts in the film, the judge only took issue with just a handful. And of that handful, we have the studies to back those pieces up."

The verdict was criticised by the National Union of Teachers, which stated that it was "inappropriate for a judge to dictate how films or other creative work was taught in schools."

Viscount Monckton criticised the judge, who he claimed had been "a Labour [Party] candidate before", and asserted that the Government had "decided that for the sake of retaining what little scientific credibility the office still has, they better admit this were errors and once they admitted them, the judge, even though he wanted to, couldn't find that Gore's film was accurate."

In July 2009, Gore was interviewed by Heather Ewart of the Australian Broadcasting Corporation. In the interview, Gore was questioned about Justice Burton's ruling that there were "nine errors" in the film. Gore commented that "the ruling was in my favour."

== Costs and funding ==
Dimmock's legal costs were said to be around £200,000. He was awarded only two-thirds of his costs and is reported to have received a bill of more than £60,000 for the remainder.

The question of the lawsuit's funding was raised in September 2007, even before the case had concluded, by a report in The Daily Telegraph which wondered "Where will the money come from?". According to Stewart Dimmock's solicitor, it was "a private matter for him". However, the Telegraph noted that Dimmock was a member of the New Party, a small right-wing party with a record of climate change denial. The party declares that "political opportunism and alarmism have combined in seizing [the IPCC's] conclusions to push forward an agenda of taxation and controls that may ultimately be ineffective in tackling climate change, but will certainly be damaging to our economy and society". The New Party was reported to be backing Dimmock. It issued a press release on 1 October 2007 in which it publicised the case and declared, somewhat prematurely, that "it is becoming increasingly unlikely that the film will ever be shown as intended." In March 2008, the New Party's manifesto-writer Christopher Monckton, 3rd Viscount Monckton of Brenchley acknowledged he had prompted an unnamed wealthy friend to fund the case and that he had himself been heavily involved in the litigation. The Observer reported at the time that Dimmock's backers were "a powerful network of business interests with close links to the fuel and mining lobbies." The chairman of the New Party, Robert Durward, has been described as "a long-time critic of environmentalists" who established a climate change denial group called the Scientific Alliance. The alliance publicised Dimmock's case on its website and was also involved in advising Channel 4 on the controversial documentary The Great Global Warming Swindle, which Viscount Monckton is distributing to schools as a riposte to An Inconvenient Truth.

== See also ==
- Education in the United Kingdom
- Climate change in the United Kingdom
