= Wake (opera) =

2018 opera by Giorgio Battistelli

- Opera by Giorgio Battistelli
- Librettist: Sarah Woods
- Language: English
- Premiere: 14 March 2018; Birmingham
- Website: www.birminghamopera.org.uk/wake-a-new-opera-for-birmingham

Wake is an opera with music by Giorgio Battistelli to a libretto by Sarah Woods. It was premiered on 14 March 2018 by Birmingham Opera Company, in a production by Graham Vick.

The opera, which lasts about 80 minutes, is based on the story of the raising of Lazarus. The production involved participation by non-professionals and audience, who were asked on entry to don veils in mourning for the deceased Lazarus.

Reviews of the opera were mixed. The Stage described the work as an "ambitious immersive opera that lacks clarity" in which the audience is steered around four trailer platforms to be confronted with a variety of scenes including police violence and gay exclusion. The Times found Batistelli's score "diffuse, [with] dated and forgettable avante-garde effects that Penderecki and Berio were doing better half a century ago", and concluded that "unlike Lazarus, it's not likely to be revived." However, it received five stars from the Birmingham Post, who described it as "a sold out success" and stated that "Wake continues BOC's record of combining innovation and engagement with sheer quality". The Arts Desk also wrote an enthusiastic review, describing the piece as "a musical-dramatic experience that leaves you with ears buzzing, mind racing, and ready to reassess everything you thought you knew about opera".

== Roles ==
Role	Voice type	Premiere 14 March 2018 Birmingham Opera Company at B12 Warehouse, Birmingham Conductor: Jonathon Heyward
Lazarus	tenor	Joshua Stewart
Jesus	baritone	Elliott Carlton Hines
Martha	soprano	Nardus Williams
Mary	soprano	Mimi Doulton
