= The Discovery of Slowness =

1983 novel by Sten Nadolny

- Author: Sten Nadolny
- Original title: Die Entdeckung der Langsamkeit
- Translator: Ralph Freedman
- Language: German
- Genre: Fiction, Historical
- Publisher: Viking Penguin
- Publication date: 1983
- English publication date: 1987
- Pages: 336

The Discovery of Slowness (original German title: Die Entdeckung der Langsamkeit) is a novel by Sten Nadolny, written under a double conceit: first, as a novelization of the life of British Arctic explorer Sir John Franklin, and second as a hymn of praise to "slowness," a quality which Nadolny's fictional Franklin possesses in abundance. Published in Germany in 1983, its fame spread through the English translation by Ralph Freedman, first published in the United States by Viking Penguin in 1987; in Nadolny's native Germany it has also been the subject of television programs, experimental films, and even an opera composed by Giorgio Battistelli.

"Slowness" — in German, "Langsamkeit" — had, before Nadolny's novel been primarily associated with mental retardation. In Nadolny's world, however, this seeming disability is in fact a powerful asset; the possessor of "slowness" can afford to wait, because he must wait. As a result, he attains victories unimaginable to the more "hurried" multitude. Nadolny's choice of a hero is apt in this regard; certainly the historical Sir John Franklin was never known for his mental alacrity, but beyond that, his "slowness" is more of a post-modern conceit. In a manner reminiscent of Roland Barthes' "autobiography" of Jules Michelet, Nadolny's Franklin is completely consistent with the known facts, all impeccably researched. Yet interwoven with the truth there is an entirely fictitious construction of Franklin as "slow," ranging from an imaginary ball-game in which the hapless John always arrives several seconds after the ball has departed to a fictitious re-creation of Franklin's efforts, at the height of Admiral Horatio Nelson's naval battles, to find and shoot a sniper from atop the masts of an enemy warship. By waiting, without panic, and carefully noting the angle at which the sniper's shots have been discharged, Franklin pinpoints his location and takes him down with a single shot.

Nadolny's choice of hero becomes more problematic later in the narrative, where it seems that Franklin's sort of slowness was decidedly not what was wanted in the Barren Lands of the Arctic, where Franklin loses more than three-quarters of his expedition to starvation, murder, and exposure. Alas for both the historical Franklin and Nadolny's oddly endearing counterfeit, Franklin's death on his final Arctic expedition of 1845 leaves unresolved the ultimate merits of his slow and steady disposition. Despite this, Nadolny's novel spurred tremendous interest in Germany, most notably in the business world, where seminars for executives on how to follow the philosophy of slowness became, for a time, de rigueur.

Nadolny wrote the foreword to an important non-fiction work on the 1845 Franklin Expedition, Der eisige Schlaf, published as Frozen In Time: The Fate of the Franklin Expedition in the original English.

== Content ==
=== Important characters ===
The character descriptions refer, for simplicity, unless otherwise stated, to the protagonist John Franklin.

- (Sir) John Franklin (Protagonist)
- Hannah Franklin (Mother)
- Tom Barker (speedy classmate and opponent, later on a friend during school)
- Sherard Philip Lound (schoolfriend)
- Dr. Orme (Teacher, fatherly figure)
- Ann Chapell (Aunt)
- Matthew Flinders (Navigator, Husband of Ann Chapell, makes Franklin familiar with navigation and takes him on the first trip to Australia)
- Mary Rose (Prostitute in Portsmouth, his first sexual experience)
- Denis Lacy (Midshipman on the Investigator, speedy opponent during the Australia trip)
- Flora Reed (Widow, second love)
- Eleanor Porden (first wife)
- Eleanor Anne Franklin (Daughter)
- Jane Griffin (Second wife, friend of Eleanor Porden)
- Sophia Cracroft (Niece and last love)
