= Journal of Biogeography =

Peer-reviewed scientific journal

- Discipline: Biogeography
- Language: English
- Edited by: Arley Muth, Luciano Bosso, Alison Nazareno, Diogo Provete

Publication details
- History: 1974–present
- Publisher: Wiley-Blackwell
- Frequency: Monthly
- Impact factor: 3.4 (2023)

Standard abbreviations
- ISO 4: J. Biogeogr.

Indexing
- ISSN: 0305-0270 (print); 1365-2699 (web)
- LCCN: 75640198
- OCLC no.: 45446950

Links
- Journal homepage; Online access; Online archive

The Journal of Biogeography is a monthly peer-reviewed scientific journal that was established in 1974. It covers aspects of spatial, ecological, and historical biogeography. The founding editor-in-chief was David Watts, followed by John Flenley (1936–2018), Philip Stott (1987-2004), Robert J. Whittaker (2004–2015), and Peter Linder (University of Zurich; 2015–2019). As of early 2023, the editor-in-chief was Michael N Dawson (University of California, Merced). Since 2024, the journal has changed its editorial board, and the new senior editors are Arley Muth, Luciano Bosso, Alison Nazareno, and Diogo Provete.

== Abstracting and indexing ==
The journal is abstracted and indexed in:

- AGRICOLA
- Biological Abstracts
- BIOSIS Previews
- CAB Abstracts
- Current Contents/Agriculture, Biology & Environmental Sciences
- Dietary Supplements database
- EBSCO databases
- Elsevier BIOBASE
- GEOBASE
- GeoRef
- Science Citation Index Expanded
- Scopus
- The Zoological Record
- VINITI Database RAS
