= Birmingham Opera Company =

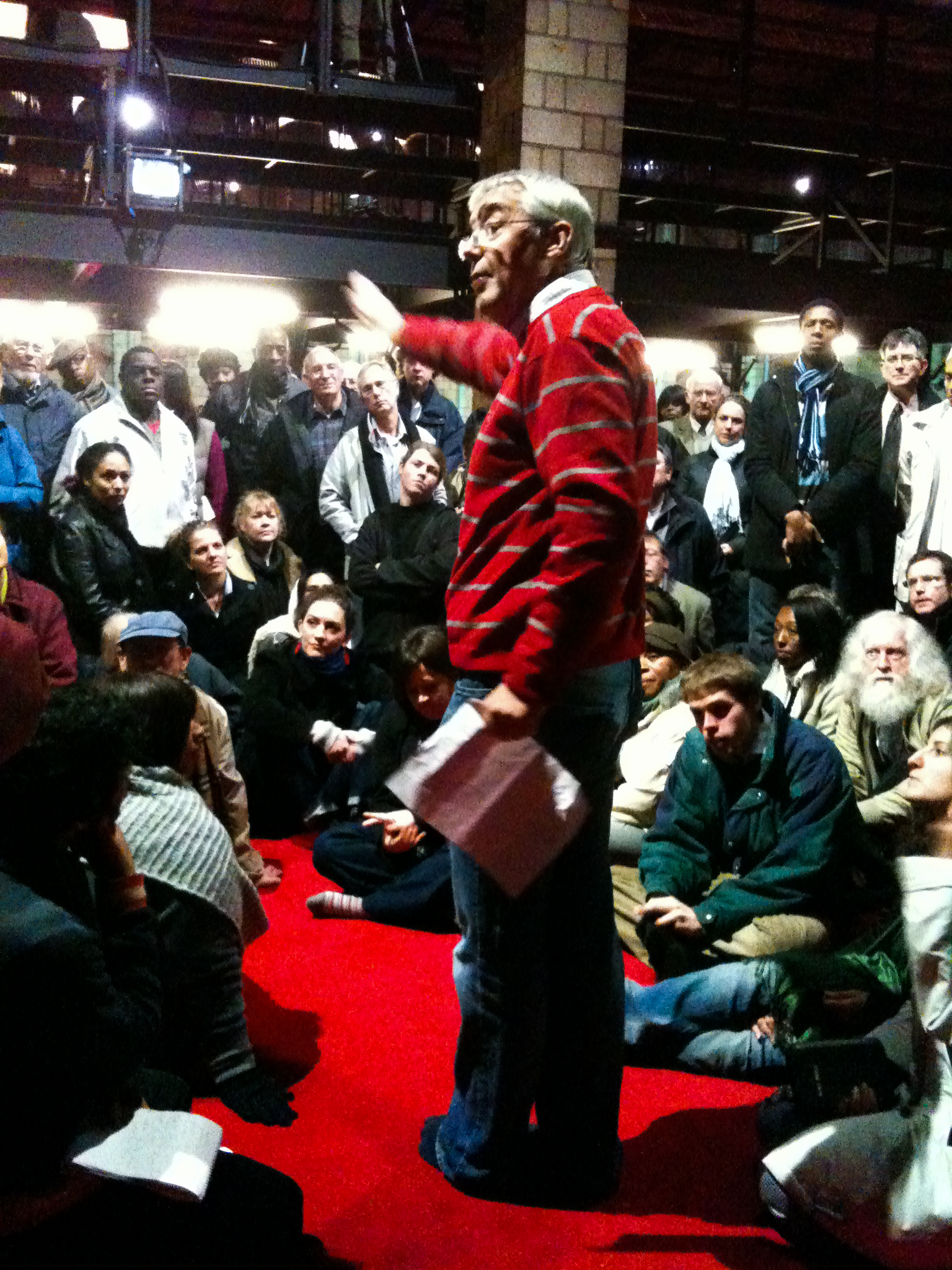
- Graham Vick coaches the chorus during a rehearsal
- Formation: 1987
- Location: Birmingham, England
- Director: Graham Vick
- Music Director: Alpesh Chauhan
- Website: www.birminghamopera.org.uk

Birmingham Opera Company is a professional opera company based in Birmingham, England, that specialises in innovative and avant-garde productions of the operatic repertoire, often in unusual venues.

== History ==
The company was founded by leading international opera director Graham Vick and conductor Simon Halsey as City of Birmingham Touring Opera in 1987, acquiring its current name in 2001. CBTO's public debut came in September 1987 with the production of Falstaff at the Cocks Moors Woods Leisure Centre in Brandwood. In 1989 City of Birmingham Touring Opera commissioned and performed Ravi Shankar's work of musical theatre Ghanashyam (A Broken Branch), which won the company's first Prudential Award for Arts; the 1990 production of Richard Wagner's Ring Saga, adapted for performance over two nights and with a reduced orchestra of eighteen musicians, won the second. Birmingham Opera Company has also won the Royal Philharmonic Society Award for Music for its 2001 production of Berg's Wozzeck in a derelict warehouse in Ladywood, and a South Bank Show Award for its 2002 production of Fidelio.

While City of Birmingham Touring Opera's works were performed nationwide and internationally, Birmingham Opera Company has since 2001 produced shows on an annual basis, working with large numbers of volunteers from local communities alongside professional musicians and performers. The company is also notable for its use of unconventional locations for its productions, ranging from a large tent in Aston Park for 2002's Fidelio, the former Municipal Bank on Broad Street for He Had It Coming (based on Mozart's Don Giovanni) in 2007, and most recently the Argyle Works, a disused chemical works in Digbeth. On a much larger scale, however, the company also performed Verdi's La traviata to an audience of almost 10,000 people at the National Indoor Arena in 2007.

Several of Birmingham Opera Company's productions have been televised on the BBC, including the 2002 production of Fidelio broadcast live on BBC Four, and a film version of Verdi's Othello broadcast in 2011 alongside an hour-long documentary, "Verdi: The Director's Cut", featuring Graham Vick's work. Othello was furthermore featured on BBC Four's "Best of European Opera 2010", broadcast on Christmas Day 2010. In 2004 the Opera Company joined forces with Birmingham Contemporary Music Group in a presentation of Benjamin Britten's Curlew River on the BBC Proms, which was also later televised on BBC Four.

Birmingham Opera has a long history of collaboration with contemporary British composer Jonathan Dove, including commissioning and performing Dove's composition Life is a Dream in March 2012, an opera in three acts with the libretto written by Alasdair Middleton and based on the play of the same name by Pedro Calderón de la Barca. Dove has also created new arrangements of classic works for the company, including 1988's Falstaff, 1990's Ring Saga and 1991's La bohème.

On 22 August 2012 the Company performed the world premiere of Karlheinz Stockhausen's Mittwoch aus Licht, the last opera of the Licht cycle to be staged, as part of the London 2012 Festival. The production featured the Elysian Quartet performing the famously complex Helicopter String Quartet, with BBC Radio 1's DJ Nihal acting as the moderator (a role previously undertaken by Stockhausen himself). The production later went on to win the Royal Philharmonic Society Award for Opera and Music Theatre.

In 2014 Birmingham Opera Company produced Musorgsky's Khovanskygate: A National Enquiry ( Khovanschina) in a big top "The Freedom Tent"in Cannon Hill Park and was awarded the International Opera Award 2015 for Best New Production, beating off competition from around the world and other shortlisted companies such as Metropolitan Opera, New York.

Birmingham Opera Company has also been a finalist in numerous awards. These include the International Opera Award for World Premiere 2013 (Mittwoch as Licht), the RPS Award for Audiences and Engagement 2015 (Khovanskygate), 2016 (The Ice Break) and 2017 (Dido and Aeneas #DnA), the International Opera Awards 2016 in two categories (Rediscovered Work and Accessibility) for Michael Tippett's The Ice Break, and The South Bank Show Sky Arts Award for Opera 2015.

In 2016 Artistic Director Graham Vick was awarded RPS Honorary Membership.

== Past productions ==
Date	Production	Notes
2018	Wake (Giorgio Battistelli)	
2014	Khovanskygate: A National Enquiry (Musorgsky)	
2013	Songs and Dances of Death (Musorgsky)	A collaboration with BBC Birmingham, BBC Academy
2012	Mittwoch aus Licht (Stockhausen)	World premiere. Production commissioned by the London 2012 Festival.
2012	Life is a Dream (Jonathan Dove)	World premiere. Opera commissioned by Birmingham Opera Company.
2010	The Wedding (Stravinsky)	
2010	A Man of Feeling (Stephen Oliver)	
2009	Othello (Verdi)	Notably the first UK production to feature a black tenor in the title role.
2008	King Idomeneo (Mozart)	
2007	La traviata (Verdi)	
2006	Ariadne Sells Out (Richard Strauss)	The Prologue from Strauss's Ariadne auf Naxos.
2006	He Had It Coming (Mozart)	Based on Mozart's Don Giovanni.
2005	Ulysses Comes Home (Monteverdi)	
2004	Curlew River (Britten)	
2003–4	Women Beware (Monteverdi)	
2003–4	Rites of Spring (Monteverdi)	
2003–4	Mortal Combat (Monteverdi)	
2003	Candide (Bernstein)	
2002	Fidelio (Beethoven)	
2001	Votzeck (Berg)	

City of Birmingham Touring Opera

- 2000: Tobias and the Angel (Jonathan Dove)
- 2000: Pelléas and Mélisande (Debussy)
- 1999: The Two Widows (Smetana)
- 1998: The Adventures of Vixen Sharp-Ears (Janáček)
- 1997: The Church Parables (Britten)
- 1997: Macbeth (Verdi)
- 1995-6: Falstaff (Verdi)
- 1995: Chaka (Akin Euba)
- 1994: Silas Marner (Howard Goodall)
- 1994: Faust (Gounod)
- 1993: Les Boréades (Rameau)
- 1992: Zaide (Mozart)
- 1991: La bohème (Puccini)
- 1989–91: The Ring Saga (Wagner)
- 1990: Beauty & the Beast (Stephen Oliver)
- 1989: Ghanashyam (A Broken Branch) (Ravi Shankar)
- 1989: Peace (Carl Davis)
- 1988-9: The Magic Flute (Mozart)
- 1987-8: Falstaff (Verdi)
