= Jenny Ungless =

Chief of Staff to the Leader of the Opposition
- In office 15 October 2001 – July 2002
- Leader: Iain Duncan Smith
- Preceded by: Sebastian Coe
- Succeeded by: Barry Legg

Personal details
- Born: 1967 or 1968 (age 58–59)
- Party: The New Party (formerly)
- Education: University of Cambridge

Jenny Ungless (born 1967 or 1968) was chief of staff to the Leader of the Opposition, Iain Duncan Smith, from October 2001 to July 2002.

== Career ==
Ungless joined the Civil Service Fast Stream in 1992, after graduating from the University of Cambridge, and subsequently worked in the Home Office and the Cabinet Office. After finding employment within the Conservative Party in 1998, Ungless was chosen by Iain Duncan Smith as his chief of staff beginning on 15 October 2001. Five months after leaving the post in July 2002, Ungless told The World at One on BBC Radio 4 that Duncan Smith's leadership was "failing to offer a positive alternative to the government" on a number of different issues.

After leaving Duncan Smith's office, Ungless became a senior figure at The New Party upon its launch in March 2003. She took a position at a recruitment firm in May 2008, before The New Party disbanded.

== Personal life ==
Ungless was in a relationship with the Conservative Member of Parliament David Maclean, whom she first met in 1993. According to the Evening Standard, Maclean had "helped secure two well-paid jobs in the party" for Ungless.
