= The New Party (UK, 2003) =

Defunct neoliberal political party in the United Kingdom

- Leader: Richard Vass
- Founded: 14 March 2003
- Dissolved: 1 July 2010
- Split from: Conservative Party
- Headquarters: 1 Northumberland Avenue, London WC2N 5BW
- Ideology: Neoliberalism; Economic liberalism Internationalism; Euroscepticism; Right-libertarianism
- Political position: Right-wing
- Colours: Red White Blue

Website
- http://www.newparty.co.uk/

The New Party was a neoliberal political party in the United Kingdom active between 2003 and 2010. The party described itself as "a party of economic liberalism, political reform and internationalism". It supported a smaller role for the state, a significant reduction in bureaucracy, renegotiation with the European Union and a strengthening of the special relationship with the United States.

The party was founded as the Scottish People's Alliance, standing at the 2003 Scottish Parliamentary Elections and receiving 7,718 votes (0.4%). The New Party did not stand in the 2005 general election.

== History ==
=== Founding ===
The New Party has its origins in the initiative A New Party for Britain launched in late 2002, at a time when speculation about the possibility of a split in the UK Conservative Party was rife, during the leadership of Iain Duncan Smith. Before the launch, the party announced in January 2003 that it planned to scrap the Scottish Parliament, and it was decried by David McLetchie, the leader of the Scottish Conservatives, as "fascist and undemocratic." The party was officially launched on 14 March 2003, when the party was founded under the name Peoples Alliance [sic], with funerals businessman Howard Hodgson as its spokesman. The launch was timed to coincide with the Conservative Party Spring Conference the next day in Harrogate. Senior figures included Jenny Ungless, Iain Duncan Smith's former chief of staff, Charlotte Kenyon, a former Conservative Party press officer, and Mark Adams, a former Conservative Party official. The head of policy in Scotland was Bruce Skivington.

=== Scottish Parliament elections ===
The initial policy programme of the party had two main planks: direct democracy, with all legislation subject to popular referendum; and Universal Benefit, a direct payment from the state to every citizen as a replacement for the current benefits system. A reduction of the voting age to 16 was also proposed. Taxes would be cut by 3p. The pledge to scrap the Scottish parliament was dropped, but the party pledged to sell the Holyrood Scottish Parliament Building, and to reduce the number of parliamentarians in Holyrood and Westminster and also to have an all-elected House of Lords. Alan Cochrane in the Daily Telegraph commented that "the Scottish People's Alliance appears to offer a mish-mash of policies, which are for the most part half-baked – but not all that more so than many of the offerings from parties of much longer standing. And if they get their act together in time they might well appeal. Their most immediate problem appears to be that they have not got their act together in anything like enough time."

The party decided to contest the Scottish Parliamentary Election in May 2003, fielding 16 candidates. However, the party received a small proportion of the vote and won no seats. This was despite the fact that two of the Peoples Alliance candidates, Lyndsay McIntosh and Keith Harding, were outgoing Conservative Members of the Scottish Parliament (MSPs). They had defected after being ranked further down the Conservative list for the election.

=== The New Party ===
Disappointed with its performance after spending £188,889 on the election, the party was relaunched in October 2003 with a revamped manifesto (direct democracy and Universal Benefit were dropped) and a revised statement of philosophy and principles, under the name 'The New Party'.

The party took no part in the 2004 European Parliament Elections. At the end of 2004, United Kingdom Independence Party MEP Robert Kilroy-Silk approached the New Party with a view to becoming leader. The executive declined 5 to 4, and several senior members of the New Party subsequently departed to join Kilroy-Silk's Veritas party at its launch in February 2005, including policy director Jonathan Lockhart, Richard Vass, the first party chairman of Veritas, and Patrick Eston, Kilroy-Silk's successor as leader.

The New Party did not contest the 2005 General Election.

In 2007 a member and two times local election candidate for the New Party, Stewart Dimmock, with backing from Viscount Monckton, the author of the party's first manifesto, launched a partly successful court case to seek to prevent the showing of the film An Inconvenient Truth in UK schools claiming that the film is political rather than scientific in nature. The court ruled that the film could be shown in schools only if teachers pointed out nine errors.

In July 2008 David Pinder, the national spokesman, became the party's first UK parliamentary candidate at the Haltemprice and Howden by-election, polling 135 votes.

In August 2009 Richard Vass was named leader, declaring the party's intention to contest the 2010 General Election.

On 1 July 2010, the New Party was de-registered with the Electoral Commission and is no longer able to field candidates.

== Policy ==
The New Party describes its philosophy as follows:

The New Party is a party of economic liberalism, political reform and internationalism. We stand for individual freedom and personal responsibility in preference to state control. We believe that only by empowering individuals and their families to take more control of their lives can we promote a spirit of mutual responsibility and respect in society as a whole.

The New Party favours small government with a flat-tax regime and measures to increase individual freedom and self-reliance, as well as deregulation of business and industry. The party recommends wholesale reform of the welfare state with measures to reduce welfare dependency, and reduction of state control of public services, including reform of the National Health Service.

The New Party proposes various reforms of parliament, including adopting the Alternative Vote system for electing the House of Commons, an appointed and non-political House of Lords, and measures to strengthen the independence of the Civil Service.

The party regards itself as internationalist in outlook, which it interprets as support for democratic governments and human rights worldwide. The party is rather more cautious with regard to international organisations such as the European Union and the United Nations. After espousing a robust eurosceptic position, the party has latterly reverted to a more equivocal stance towards the European Union. It has also been critical of the United Nations as an undemocratic body without moral authority.

In foreign policy the party has adopted a liberal interventionist or neo-conservative approach and has been strongly supportive of the war on terror, and British and American military intervention in Iraq and Afghanistan.

The most recent published policy statement of the New Party is the Manifesto for a World Class Nation, published in 2005.

== Organisation ==
The party chairman, founder and chief financial backer of the New Party was Scottish millionaire businessman Robert Durward. The Party is governed by a National Policy Committee for the UK as a whole, and by a Scottish Policy Committee in Scotland.

The New Party was well-funded thanks to the financial support of its chairman, and the party had a small full-time staff from the outset, with three full-time staff at the offices at Almondvale football ground in Livingston and two at Mark Adams' office in London in 2003. Duward's company Cloburn Quarry funded the Peoples Alliance with £490,000 in 2003, and gave the New Party £284,000 in 2004, £393,000 in 2005, £135,000 in 2006, £209,093 in 2007, and £125,000 in 2008. Friends of the Earth suggested when the party launched in 2003 that the motivation for the party was Duward's opposition to a tax on the extraction of construction aggregate.

Subsequent analysis of records at the Electoral Commission shows that Durward's company Cloburn was the only registered donor to The New Party during its lifetime, donating £1,382,819.88.

| Year | Donation |
|---|---|
| 2003 | £10,640 |
| 2004 | £389,000 |
| 2005 | £348,500 |
| 2006 | £218,079.88 |
| 2007 | £197,100 |
| 2008 | £107,000 |
| 2009 | £72,500 |
| 2010 | £40,000 |

== Local elections ==
On 30 March 2006 Donald McDiarmid contested a local council by-election in the Borestone ward in Stirling, polling just 18 votes (1.9%).

At the local government elections in England on 4 May 2006, five New Party candidates stood in five separate local government areas in Hertfordshire, Lancashire and Yorkshire, averaging 204 votes (8.7%).

In a by-election for Dover Town Council in October 2006 Stewart Dimmock, the New Party candidate, polled 139 votes (27.0%).
