= Robert Corell =

American climate scientist (1934–2025)

Robert W. Corell (November 4, 1934 – January 16, 2025) was an American global climate scientist.

== Early life and education ==
Robert W. Corell was born on November 4, 1934, in Detroit, Michigan, United States.

Corell was an oceanographer and engineer by background and training, having received Ph.D., M.S., and B.S. degrees at Case Western Reserve University and MIT.

== Career ==
Corell was a principal for the Global Environment & Technology Foundation, an ambassador for ClimateWorks Foundation, professor II at the University of the Arctic's new Institute of Circumpolar Reindeer Husbandry, a professor II at the University of Tromso in Norway, and director of the Sarasota, Florida-based Climate Adaptation Center (CAC). He was a partner of the Sustainability Institute and its C-ROADS Climate Interactive Initiative, and head of US Office for the Global Energy Assessment.

He contributed to the assessment reports of the Intergovernmental Panel on Climate Change, an organisation that was co-awarded the 2007 Nobel Peace Prize, and in 2010 he was awarded an honorary Doctor of Veterinarian Medicine by the Norges veterinærhøgskole (Norwegian School of Veterinarian Science). He joined the H. John Heinz III Center for Science, Economics and the Environment in 2006 as vice president for programs and policy (until January 2010).

Corell served as an affiliate of the Washington Advisory Group and was a senior policy fellow at the Policy Program of the American Meteorological Society. He completed an appointment that began in January 2000 as a senior research fellow in the Belfer Center for Science and International Affairs at Harvard University's Kennedy School of Government. Corell had been quoted in the Washington Post, Vanity Fair, Golf Digest, CBS News' 60 Minutes, and many additional public media outlets such as Skavlan. Corell was actively engaged in research concerned with the sciences of global change and the interface between science and public policy, particularly research activities that are focused on global and regional climate change, related environmental issues, and science to facilitate understanding of vulnerability and sustainable development. He co-chaired an international strategic planning group that is developing a strategy designed to harness science, technology, and innovation for sustainable development; served as the chair of the Arctic Climate Impact Assessment; counseled as senior science advisor to ManyOne.Net; and was chair of the board of the Digital Universe Foundation. Corell was assistant director for Geosciences at the National Science Foundation, where he had oversight for the Atmospheric, Earth, and Ocean Sciences and the global change programs of the National Science Foundation (NSF). He was also a professor and academic administrator at the University of New Hampshire.

He had also held appointments at the Woods Hole Institution of Oceanography, the Scripps Institution of Oceanography, the University of Washington, and Case Western Reserve University.

Corell died on January 16, 2025, at the age of 90.

== Recognition and awards ==
In 1996 he was Awarded Brazilian Order of Scientific Merit by the President of Brazil. In 2003 a Mountain region in Antarctic was named the "Corell Cirque" in his honor.
