= John Nielsen-Gammon =

American meteorologist and climatologist

External image
- John Nielsen-Gammon, 2006

John Nielsen-Gammon (born 1962) is an American meteorologist and climatologist. He is a Professor of Meteorology at Texas A&M University, and the Texas State Climatologist, holding both appointments since 2000. His research group uses a combination of observational and computational techniques to study the characteristics, dynamics, and forecasting of certain weather phenomena. Much of his recent work has involved air pollution meteorology. He writes a popular online column on climate science for the Houston Chronicle. He wrote,

My goal is to be completely honest, fair, and intelligent in my public outreach, thereby guaranteeing that there’s at least one of us. (But, to be fair, fairness is in the eye of the beholder.)

On December 22, 2009, Nielsen-Gammon wrote a detailed analysis of the erroneous projected date of melting of Himalayan glaciers in the Working Group II section of the IPCC Fourth Assessment Report which said that "the likelihood of them disappearing by the year 2035 and perhaps sooner is very high if the Earth keeps warming at the current rate." This had already been controversial in India, and the error had been found by J. Graham Cogley, a glaciologist in the Department of Geography at Trent University, Ontario. The story had been covered by BBC News but had not at that time gained wider publicity. Nielsen-Gammon's article identified and documented further details of the sources of the error.

Nielsen-Gammon earned an S.B. (Earth and Planetary Sciences), S.M. (Meteorology), and Ph.D. (Meteorology), all from MIT. Both Kerry Emanuel and Richard S. Lindzen were on his Ph.D. committee.

== Selected publications ==
- John Nielsen-Gammon and Howard Johnson, Texas and Oklahoma's Greatest Hits: The most significant weather events to strike Texas and Oklahoma, 2004, Office of the State Climatologist, Texas
- John W. Nielsen-Gammon, An Inconvenient Truth: The Scientific Argument, 2008, GeoJournal, doi:10.1007/s10708-008-9126-z
- MC Morgan, JW Nielsen-Gammon, Using Tropopause Maps to Diagnose Midlatitude Weather Systems, 1998, Monthly Weather Review, Volume 126, Issue 10.
- JW Nielsen-Gammon, Initial Modeling of the August 2000 Houston-Galveston Ozone Episode, 2001, Report to the Technical Analysis Division, Texas Natural Resource Conservation Commission.
- John Nielsen-Gammon, 2010, Beyond 2035: IPCC and the Himalayan Glaciers, Houston Chronicle, September 1, 2010

== Sources and external links ==
- Nielsen-Gammon's profile at Texas A&M University
- Office of the Texas State Climatologist
- Atmo.Sphere, Nielsen-Gammon's first online column at the Houston Chronicle
- Climate Abyss, his new column there, commencing 3-28-2010
