= Graham Vick =

British opera director (1953–2021)

Sir Graham Vick CBE
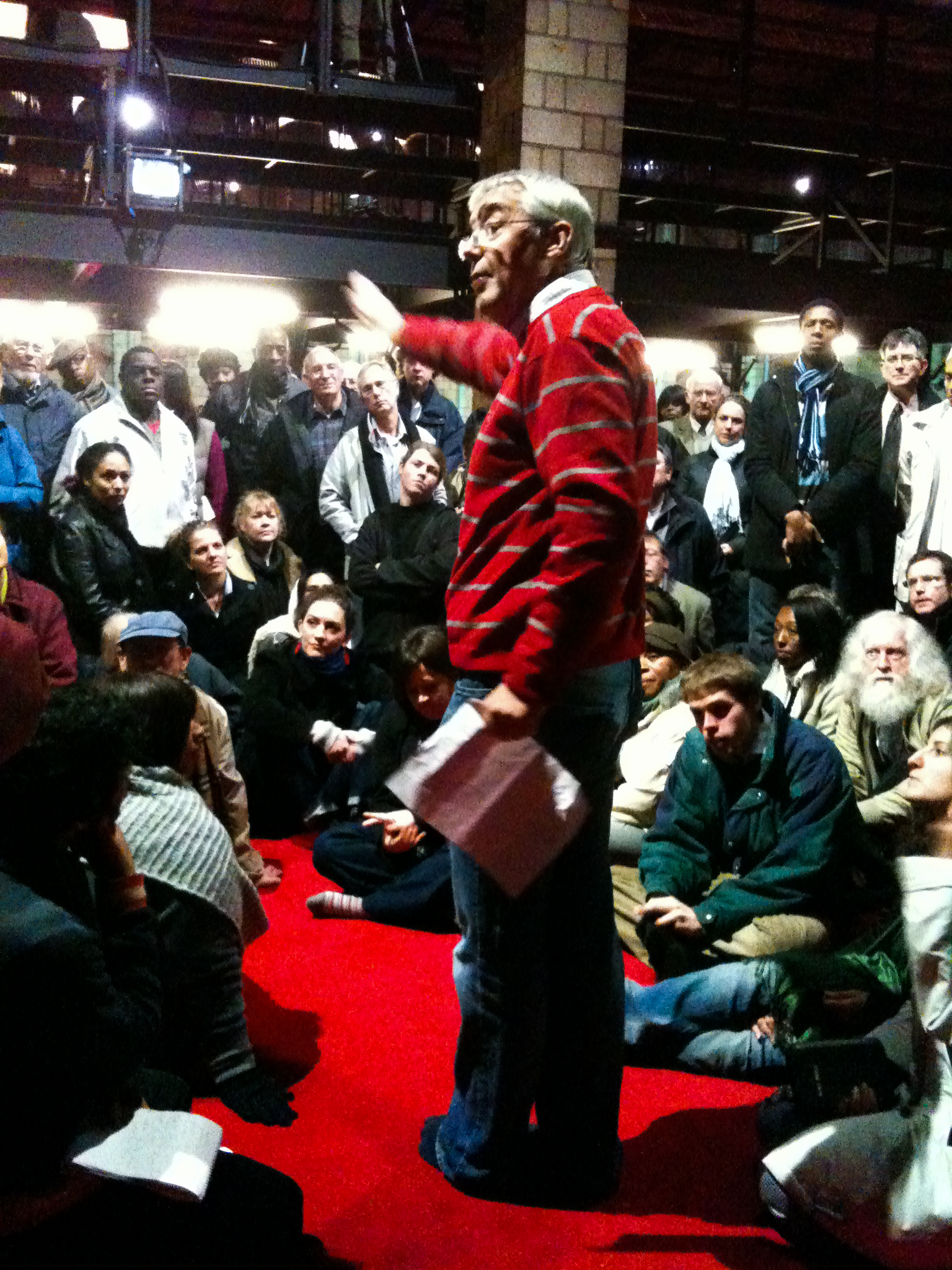
- Vick coaches the Birmingham Opera Company chorus during a rehearsal
- Born: 30 December 1953; Birkenhead, England
- Died: 17 July 2021 (aged 67); London, England
- Education: Royal Northern College of Music
- Occupation: Opera director

Sir Graham Vick (30 December 1953 – 17 July 2021) was an English opera director known for his experimental and revisionist stagings of traditional and modern operas. He worked in many of the world's leading opera houses and was artistic director of the Birmingham Opera Company.

== Life and career ==
Vick was born on 30 December 1953 in Birkenhead, the youngest son of Arnold and Muriel (née Hynes) Vick. He studied at the Royal Northern College of Music in Manchester. At age 24, he directed a production of Gustav Holst's Savitri for the Scottish Opera and became the company's director of productions in 1984. From 1994 to 2000, Vick was director of productions at Glyndebourne Opera.

In 1987, he founded the Birmingham Opera Company and remained its artistic director. Vick's productions with Birmingham Opera included the first UK production of Othello to feature a black tenor in the title role in 2009, and the 2012 world premiere of Karlheinz Stockhausen's notoriously difficult Mittwoch aus Licht.

Vick died from complications arising from COVID-19 on 17 July 2021, aged 67.

== Honours and awards ==
In 2005, the National Portrait Gallery, London acquired a portrait of Vick by the photographer Lorentz Gullachsen. Vick was awarded as Knight of the French Ordre des Arts et des Lettres, as Honorary Professor of Music at the University of Birmingham, and as International Chair of Opera at the Royal Northern College of Music. He was also awarded Honorary Membership of the Royal Philharmonic Society in 2016. Vick was appointed Commander of the Order of the British Empire (CBE) in the 2009 Birthday Honours and knighted in the 2021 New Year Honours for services to music and the regions.

== Recordings ==
Many of Vick's productions can be seen on DVD including Lulu (Glyndebourne, 2004) Warner Music Vision B000189L10, and Falstaff (Covent Garden, 2001) Opus Arte B00005NUP8.

== Sources ==
- Millington, Barry, "Vick, Graham" in The New Grove Dictionary of Opera, ed. Stanley Sadie (London, 1992) ISBN 0-333-73432-7
- Jasper Rees, 'La traviata: A Nuremberg-style display of synchronised chair-swivelling', The Daily Telegraph, 25 October 2007
- Edward Rothstein, 'In New Hall, Echoes of Glyndebourne Old', New York Times, 4 June 1994
- Martin Bernheimer, 'Living Dangerously' (Profile of Graham Vick), Opera News, June 2000
- Hamilton, Mary. (1990). A-Z of Opera. New York, Oxford, Sydney: Facts On File. p. 212. ISBN 0-8160-2340-9.
- Sadie, Stanley and John Tyrrell. (2001). The New Grove Dictionary of Music and Musicians. London: Macmillan Publishers Ltd. Vol. 26, p. 530. ISBN 0-333-60800-3.
- Warrack, John, and Ewan West. (1996 3rd ed.). The Concise Oxford Dictionary of Opera. New York: Oxford University Press. p. 538. ISBN 0-19-280028-0.
