= CO2 (opera) =

2015 opera by Giorgio Battistelli

CO_{2}
- Opera by Giorgio Battistelli
- Librettist: Robert Carsen
- Language: English
- Based on: An Inconvenient Truth
- Premiere: 16 May 2015; La Scala

CO_{2} is an Italian opera by Giorgio Battistelli which premiered at La Scala on May 16, 2015. It is based on Al Gore's documentary An Inconvenient Truth, and Gore was initially a character in the opera. The libretto, primarily in English but containing passages in other languages, was written by Robert Carsen, who directed the production, and Ian Burton.

== Works with similar themes ==
- Anthropocene (opera) 2019 by Stuart MacRae
- Auksalaq (opera) 2012 by Matthew Burtner
