= Sten Nadolny =

German novelist

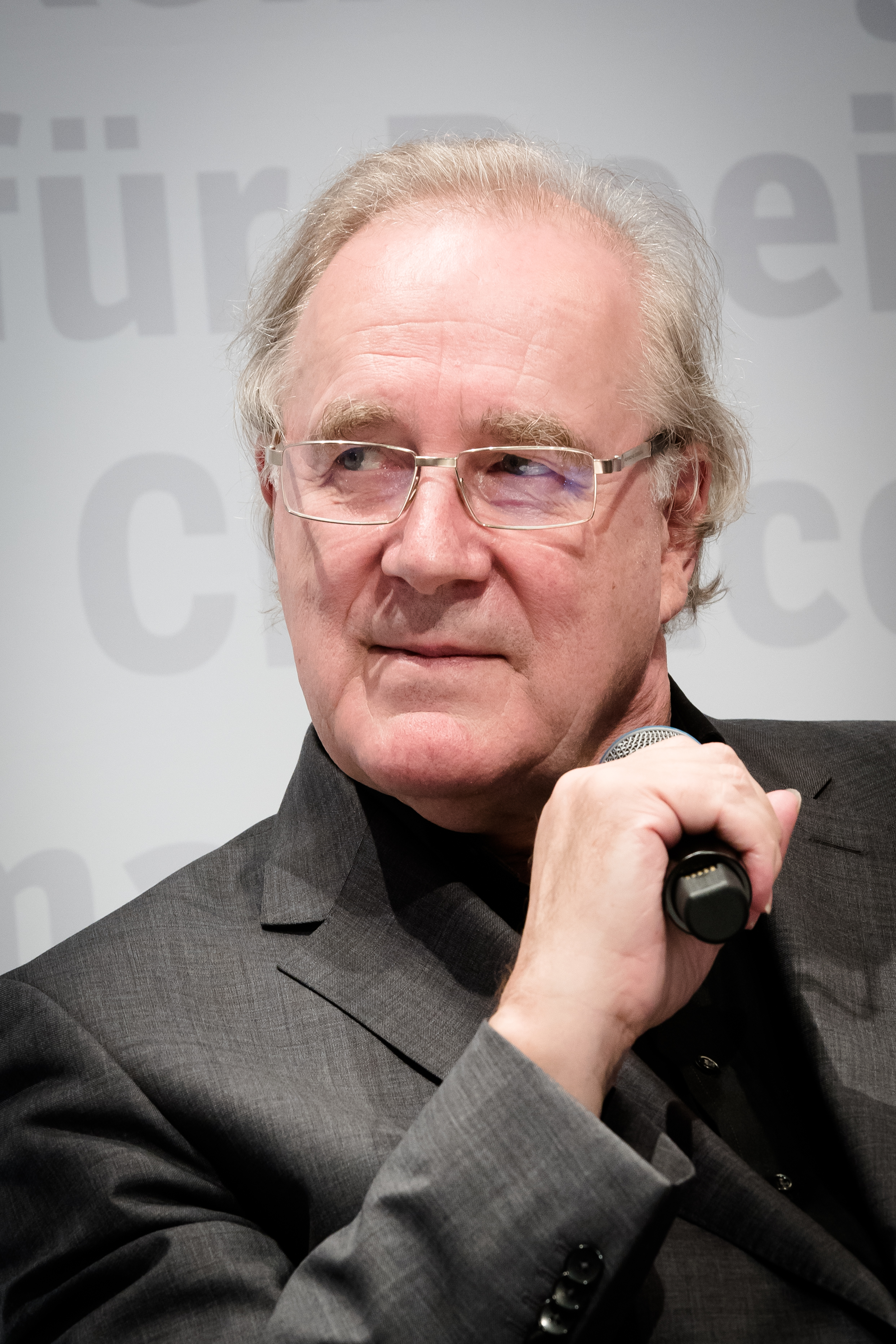
Sten Nadolny at the Frankfurt Book Fair 2017

Sten Nadolny (pronounced [stɛn naː.ˈdɔl.niː]; born 29 July 1942, in Zehdenick, Province of Brandenburg) is a German novelist. His parents, Burkhard and Isabella Nadolny, were also writers.

== Biography ==
Nadolny grew up in the town of Traunstein, in Upper Bavaria. After receiving his Abitur, he studied history and political science in Munich, Göttingen, Tübingen and Berlin. Nadolny received his PhD in 1976 at the Free University of Berlin. His dissertation was on German disarmament diplomacy at the 1932/33 Geneva Conference, shortly before Hitler came to power. Nadolny's grandfather, Rudolf Nadolny, had led the German delegation.

Nadolny worked for about a year as a history teacher before entering the film industry as a production manager, an experience he wrote about in his first novel, the semi-autobiographical Netzkarte. He currently lives in Berlin.

== Literary works ==
Nadolny's first novel, Netzkarte, was published in 1981. Originally, it was written as a script for a film that was never realized. It details the adventures of a young man named Ole Reuter, who purchases a "Netzkarte", or ticket that allows him to travel by train throughout (then West) Germany. Nadolny revisits the character of Ole Reuter in a sequel, Er oder Ich ("Him or Me"), published in 1999.

His best known work is The Discovery of Slowness (1987; originally published in 1983 as Die Entdeckung der Langsamkeit), a fictionalized meditation on the life and lessons of British Arctic explorer Sir John Franklin. A pre-publication portion of the novel titled Kopenhagen 1801 (which would become the fifth chapter) had earned Nadolny the Ingeborg Bachmann Prize in 1980.

== Bibliography ==
- 1978: Abrüstungsdiplomatie 1932/33: Deutschland auf der Genfer Konferenz im Ubergang von Weimar zu Hitler. Tuduv-Studien, Munich. ISBN 3-88073-066-0
- 1981: Netzkarte. List, Munich. ISBN 3-471-78220-6
- 1983: Die Entdeckung der Langsamkeit. Piper, Munich. ISBN 3-492-02828-4 (The Discovery of Slowness, Viking, 1987)
- 1990: Selim oder Die Gabe der Rede. Piper, Munich. ISBN 3-492-02978-7
- 1990: Das Erzählen und die guten Absichten: Münchner Poetikvorlesungen im Sommer 1990. Piper, Munich. ISBN 3-492-11319-2
- 1994: Ein Gott der Frechheit. Piper, Munich. ISBN 3-492-03700-3 (God of Impertinence, Viking 1997)
- 1999: Er oder ich: Roman. Piper, Munich. ISBN 3-492-04165-5
- 2001: Das Erzählen und die guten Ideen: die Göttinger und Münchener Poetik-Vorlesungen. Piper, Munich. ISBN 3-492-23433-X
- 2003: Ullsteinroman. Ullstein, Munich. ISBN 3-550-08414-5
- 2004: Deutsche Gestalten. (together with Hartmut von Hentig (Eds.)) dtv, Munich. ISBN 3-423-13218-3
- 2009: Putz- und Flickstunde. Zwei Kalte Krieger erinnern sich. (together with Jens Sparschuh) Piper, Munich. ISBN 978-3-492-05230-6
- 2012: Weitlings Sommerfrische. Piper, Munich. ISBN 978-3-492-05450-8
- 2017: Das Glück des Zauberers. Piper, Munich. ISBN 978-3-492-05835-3 (The Joy of Sorcery, Paul Dry Books, Philadelphia 2020)

== Awards ==
- 1980: Ingeborg Bachmann Prize
- 1985: Hans Fallada Prize
- 1986: Premio Vallombrosa
- 1995: Ernst Hoferichter Prize
- 2004: Jakob-Wassermann-Literaturpreis
- 2005: Mainzer Stadtschreiber
- 2010: Weilheimer Literature Prize
