= The Great Global Warming Swindle =

- DVD cover
- Directed by: Martin Durkin
- Country of origin: United Kingdom

Production
- Running time: 75 mins

Original release
- Network: Channel 4
- Release: 8 March 2007

The Great Global Warming Swindle is a 2007 British conspiracy theory documentary film directed by Martin Durkin. The film denies the reality and causes of climate change, justifying this by suggesting that climatology is influenced by funding and political factors. The program was formally criticised by Ofcom, the UK broadcasting regulatory agency, which ruled the film failed to uphold due impartiality and upheld complaints of misrepresentation made by David King, who appeared in the film.

The film presents scientists, economists, politicians, writers, and others who dispute the scientific consensus regarding anthropogenic global warming. The programme's publicity materials claim that man-made global warming is "a lie" and "the biggest scam of modern times." Its original working title was "Apocalypse my arse", but the title The Great Global Warming Swindle was later adopted as an allusion to the 1980 mockumentary The Great Rock 'n' Roll Swindle about British punk band the Sex Pistols.

The UK's Channel 4 premiered the documentary on 8 March 2007. The channel described the film as "a polemic that drew together the well-documented views of a number of respected scientists to reach the same conclusions. This is a controversial film but we feel that it is important that all sides of the debate are aired." According to Hamish Mykura, Channel 4's head of documentaries, the film was commissioned "to present the viewpoint of the small minority of scientists who do not believe global warming is caused by anthropogenic production of carbon dioxide."

Although the documentary was welcomed by climate change deniers, it was criticised by scientific organisations and individual scientists, including one of the scientists interviewed in the film and one whose research was used to support the film's claims. The film misuses and fabricates data, relies on out-of-date research, employs misleading arguments, and misrepresents the position of the Intergovernmental Panel on Climate Change.

== Summary ==
The film uses techniques, like selective presentation, to cast doubt on the scientific consensus on climate change and lend credence to contrary viewpoints. It argues that the consensus is the result of a "multibillion-dollar" conspiracy of environmentalists, scientists and politicians. The film also argues Western environmentalists promoting renewables over cheap fossil fuels prevents African countries from industrialising. The film is an example of the conspiracy theory documentary genre, and it presents a conspiratorial view about the mainstream scientific institutions that have established the facts of climate change.

The film features interviews, including with Patrick Moore, Greenpeace member turned industry consultant; Richard Lindzen, MIT professor of meteorology; Patrick Michaels, Professor of Environmental Sciences at the University of Virginia; Nigel Calder, editor of New Scientist from 1962 to 1966; John Christy, professor and director of the Earth System Science Center at University of Alabama; Paul Reiter of the Pasteur Institute; former British Chancellor of the Exchequer Nigel Lawson; and Piers Corbyn, a British weather forecaster. (full list at § Contributors) Carl Wunsch, MIT professor of oceanography, also interviewed, has since said that he strongly disagrees with the film's conclusions and the way his interview material was used.

=== Evidence ===
EPICA and Vostok ice cores display the relationship between temperature and level of CO_{2} for the last 650,000 years. ("Current CO_{2} level" is as of 2006.)

The film claims contradictions in the evidence for climate change. For example, it selectively shows a pause in warming between 1940 and 1975. The film states that models suggest warming should be faster in the troposphere than at the surface, which it says the data does not support, instead showing surface warming greater or equal to the lower troposphere. It also argues for solar variation as the driver of warming.

The film states that carbon dioxide is a small part—just 0.054%—of the Earth's atmosphere, and water vapour has the greatest impact. The initial version of the film also claimed that volcanoes emitted more CO_{2} than human activity, though this was removed from later versions after Durkin acknowledged it was wrong.

The film claims temperatures cause changing CO_{2} rather than the other way around, arguing the oceans release carbon dioxide when they warm. According to the film, increases in CO_{2} levels lagged behind temperature increases during glacial terminations, by over 100 years, but it takes hundreds of years for global temperature changes to register in oceanic mass, which is why ice cores shows changes in CO_{2} follow changes in global temperature by 800 years.

The film also argues that current global warming is nothing unusual and temperatures were more extreme during the Medieval Warm Period, associating it with prosperity in western Europe.

=== Politics ===
According to the film, global warming research "is now one of the best funded areas of science." asserting that scientists seeking research funding are more likely to succeed if the grant is linked to global warming.

The film argues that vested interests have greater impact on proponents (rather than detractors) of global warming because there are hundreds of thousands of jobs created, and denies global warming denialists are funded by the fossil fuel industry. It claims scientists who speak out against global warming risk persecution, death threats, loss of funding, personal attacks, and reputational damage.

The film proposes that some supporters do so because it supports their emotional and ideological beliefs against capitalism, economic development, globalisation, industrialisation, and the United States. It claims that global warming was promoted by the British Conservative Prime Minister Margaret Thatcher to promote nuclear power and reduce the impact of strikes in the state-owned coal industry by the National Union of Mineworkers.

=== Existence of consensus ===
The film asserts that it is false that "2,500 top scientists" support the Intergovernmental Panel on Climate Change (IPCC)'s reports on global warming and claims the report includes many politicians and non-scientists, and even dissenters who demanded that their names be removed from the report. It argues that IPCC reports misrepresent the views of contributing scientists through selective editorialising, and features Paul Reiter of the Pasteur Institute complaining that the IPCC did not take his professional opinion under greater consideration. It states that the IPCC kept his name on the report as a contributor until he threatened legal action.

According to the film, global warming is promoted with a ferocity and intensity similar to religious fervour. Denialists are treated as heretics and equated with holocaust deniers. Tim Ball states in the film (and in subsequent press publicity) that he has received death threats because of sceptical statements he has made about global warming.

== Reception and criticism ==
The show attracted 2.5 million viewers and an audience share of 11.5%. Channel 4 stated that it had received 758 calls and emails about the programme, with those in favour outnumbering complaints by six to one.

Following criticism from scientists the film has been changed since it was first broadcast on Channel 4. One graph had its time axis relabelled, the claim that volcanoes produce more CO_{2} than humans was removed, and following objections about how his interview had been used, the interview with Carl Wunsch was removed for the international and DVD releases of the programme.

Other scientific arguments used in the film have been described as refuted or misleading by scientists working in the relevant fields. Critics have also argued that the programme is one-sided and that the mainstream position on global warming, as supported by the scientific academies of the major industrialised nations and other scientific organisations, is incorrectly represented.

The film won best documentary award at the 2007 Io Isabella International Film Week.

=== Complaints received by Ofcom ===
The British broadcasting regulator, the Office of Communications (Ofcom), received 265 complaints about the programme, one of which was a 176-page detailed complaint co-written by a group of scientists. Ofcom ruled on 21 July 2008 that the programme had unfairly treated Sir David King, the IPCC and Carl Wunsch. Ofcom also found that part 5 of the programme (the 'political' part) had breached several parts of the Broadcasting Code regarding impartiality; however, the Code rules on impartiality did not apply to the scientific arguments in parts 1–4, because the link between human activity and global warming had largely been settled before March 2007. OfCom did not rule on the programme's accuracy, but did rule that: "On balance it did not materially mislead the audience so as to cause harm or offence." On 4 and 5 August 2008, Channel 4 and More 4 broadcast a summary of Ofcom's findings, though it will not face sanctions.

=== Reactions from scientists ===
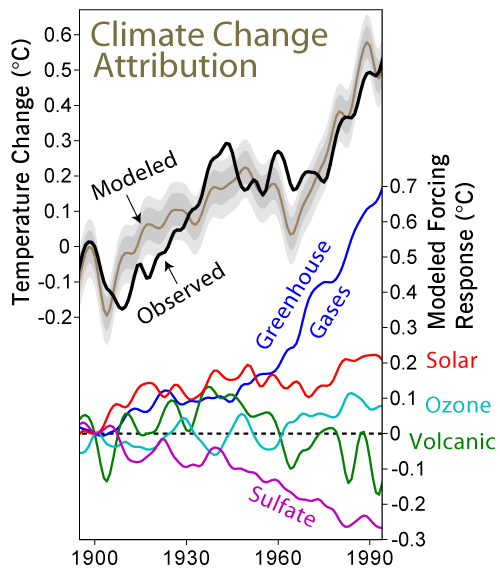
Sulfate aerosol and greenhouse gases effect on climate change based on Meehl et al. (2004) in Journal of Climate

The IPCC was one of the main targets of the documentary. In response to the programme's broadcast, John T. Houghton (co-chair IPCC Scientific Assessment working group 1988–2002) assessed some of its main assertions and conclusions. According to Houghton the programme was "a mixture of truth, half truth and falsehood put together with the sole purpose of discrediting the science of global warming," which he noted had been endorsed by the scientific community, including the Academies of Science of the major industrialised countries and China, India and Brazil. Houghton rejected claims that observed changes in global average temperature are within the range of natural climate variability or that solar influences are the main driver; that the troposphere is warming less than the surface; that volcanic eruptions emit more carbon dioxide than fossil fuel burning; that climate models are too complex and uncertain to provide useful projections of climate change; and that IPCC processes were biased. Houghton acknowledges that ice core samples show CO_{2} driven by temperature, but then writes that the programme's assertion that "this correlation has been presented as the main evidence for global warming by the IPCC [is] NOT TRUE. For instance, I often show that diagram in my lectures on climate change but always make the point that it gives no proof of global warming due to increased carbon dioxide."

The British Antarctic Survey released a statement about The Great Global Warming Swindle. It is highly critical of the programme, singling out the use of a graph with the incorrect time axis, and also the statements made about solar activity: "A comparison of the distorted and undistorted contemporary data reveal that the plot of solar activity bears no resemblance to the temperature curve, especially in the last 20 years." Comparing scientific methods with Channel 4's editorial standards, the statement says: "Any scientist found to have falsified data in the manner of the Channel 4 programme would be guilty of serious professional misconduct." It uses the feedback argument to explain temperatures rising before CO_{2}. On the issue of volcanic CO_{2} emissions, it says:

A second issue was the claim that human emissions of CO_{2} are small compared to natural emissions from volcanoes. This is untrue: current annual emissions from fossil fuel burning and cement production are estimated to be around 100 times greater than average annual volcanic emissions of CO_{2}. That large volcanoes cannot significantly perturb the CO_{2} concentration of the atmosphere is apparent from the ice core and atmospheric record of CO_{2} concentrations, which shows a steady rise during the industrial period, with no unusual changes after large eruptions.

Alan Thorpe, professor of meteorology at the University of Reading and Chief Executive of the UK Natural Environment Research Council, commented on the film in New Scientist: "First, let's deal with the main thesis: that the presence or absence of cosmic rays in Earth's atmosphere is a better explanation for temperature variation than the concentration of CO_{2} and other gases. This is not a new assertion and it is patently wrong: there is no credible evidence that cosmic rays play a significant role...Let scepticism reign, but let's not play games with the evidence."

The Royal Society has issued a press release in reaction to the film. In it, Martin Rees, the president of the Royal Society, briefly restates the scientific consensus on climate change and adds:

Scientists will continue to monitor the global climate and the factors which influence it. It is important that all legitimate potential scientific explanations continue to be considered and investigated. Debate will continue, and the Royal Society has just hosted a two-day discussion meeting attended by over 300 scientists, but it must not be at the expense of action. Those who promote fringe scientific views but ignore the weight of evidence are playing a dangerous game. They run the risk of diverting attention from what we can do to ensure the world's population has the best possible future.

Thirty-seven British scientists signed a letter of complaint, saying that they "believe that the misrepresentations of facts and views, both of which occur in your programme, are so serious that repeat broadcasts of the programme, without amendment, are not in the public interest. In view of the seriousness of climate change as an issue, it is crucial that public debate about it is balanced and well-informed".

According to the Guardian in 2007, a study published by, among others, Mike Lockwood, a solar physicist at the Rutherford Appleton Laboratory was partially inspired in response to The Great Global Warming Swindle. Lockwood then had co-authored a paper about solar data from the past 40 years. He found that between 1985 and 1987, the solar factors that should affect climate performed a "U-turn in every possible way", therefore 2007 cooling would have to be expected, which was not the case then. Lockwood therefore was quoted several times as critical evidence against various claims made in the film.

Some Australian meteorologists also weighed in, saying that the film made no attempt to offer a "critical deconstruction of climate science orthodoxies", but instead used various other means to suggest that climate scientists are guilty of lying or are seriously misguided. Although the film's publicist's asserted that "global warming is 'the biggest scam of modern times'", these meteorologists concluded that the film was "not scientifically sound and presents a flawed and very misleading interpretation of the science". Volume 20 of the Bulletin of the Australian Meteorological and Oceanographic Society presented a critique by David Jones, Andrew Watkins, Karl Braganza and Michael Coughlan.

The Great Global Warming Swindle does not represent the current state of knowledge in climate science... Many of the hypotheses presented in the Great Global Warming Swindle have been considered and rejected by due scientific process. This documentary is far from an objective, critical examination of climate science. Instead the Great Global Warming Swindle goes to great lengths to present outdated, incorrect or ambiguous data in such a way as to grossly distort the true understanding of climate change science, and to support a set of extremely controversial views.

A public forum entitled "Debunking "The Great Global Warming Swindle"" was held at the Australian National University in Canberra on 13 July 2007, at which scientists from the Australian National University, Stanford University, USA, and ARC Centre of Excellence for Coral Reef Studies exposed what they described "as the scientific flaws and half-truths in the claims of climate change skeptics"

=== Criticism from two scientists featured ===
==== Carl Wunsch ====
Carl Wunsch, professor of Physical Oceanography at MIT, is featured in the Channel 4 version of the programme. Afterwards he said that he was "completely misrepresented" in the film and had been "totally misled" when he agreed to be interviewed. He called the film "grossly distorted" and "as close to pure propaganda as anything since World War Two", and he lodged a complaint with Ofcom. He particularly objected to how his interview material was used:

In the part of The Great Climate Change Swindle where I am describing the fact that the ocean tends to expel carbon dioxide where it is warm, and to absorb it where it is cold, my intent was to explain that warming the ocean could be dangerous—because it is such a gigantic reservoir of carbon. By its placement in the film, it appears that I am saying that since carbon dioxide exists in the ocean in such large quantities, human influence must not be very important—diametrically opposite to the point I was making—which is that global warming is both real and threatening.

Filmmaker Durkin responded:

Carl Wunsch was most certainly not 'duped' into appearing in the film, as is perfectly clear from our correspondence with him. Nor are his comments taken out of context. His interview, as used in the programme, perfectly accurately represents what he said.

Wunsch has stated that he finds the statements at both extremes of the global climate change debate distasteful. He wrote in a letter dated 15 March 2007 that he believes climate change is "real, a major threat, and almost surely has a major human-induced component. But I have tried to stay out of the 'climate wars' because all nuance tends to be lost, and the distinction between what we know firmly, as scientists, and what we suspect is happening, is so difficult to maintain in the presence of rhetorical excess." He further cautiously states that "The science of climate change remains incomplete. Some elements are so firmly based on well-understood principles, or for which the observational record is so clear, that most scientists would agree that they are almost surely true (adding CO_{2} to the atmosphere is dangerous; sea level will continue to rise, ...). Other elements remain more uncertain, but we as scientists in our roles as informed citizens believe society should be deeply concerned about their possibility: failure of US midwestern (sic) precipitation in 100 years in a mega-drought; melting of a large part of the Greenland ice sheet, among many other examples."

Wunsch has said that he received a letter from the production company, Wag TV, threatening to sue him for defamation unless he agreed to make a public statement that he was neither misrepresented nor misled. Wunsch refused, although he states he was forced to hire a solicitor in the UK.

Following Wunsch's complaints, his interview material was removed from the international and DVD versions of the film.

On 7 December 2007, Wunsch restated his critique on the Australian Broadcasting Corporation's Lateline programme after the film was screened, saying: "It's not a science film at all. It's a political statement." In the same interview, reacting to what he claimed were new and further distortions by Durkin, Wunsch said:

Durkin says that I reacted to the way the film portrayed me because of pressure from my colleagues. This is completely false. I did hear almost immediately from colleagues in the UK who saw the film who didn't berate me. They simply said, "This doesn't sound like you, this seems to be distorting your views, you better have a look at this,"

===== Ruling on Wunsch complaint =====
Ofcom divided Wunsch's complaint into three parts, ruling in his favour on two parts and against him on one part.

- Ofcom agreed with Wunsch that he was misled as to the programme's intent, ruling that he wasn't given sufficient information about the polemical nature and tone of the programme to allow him to give informed consent for his participation.
- Ofcom also found that Wunsch's general views were misrepresented:
  The Committee did not consider that the editing of the programme presented Professor Wunsch as denying that global warming is taking place. However it noted that the programme included his edited interview in the context of a range of scientists who denied the scientific consensus about the anthropogenic causes of global warming. In the Committee's view Professor Wunsch made clear in his full unedited interview that he largely accepted this consensus and the seriousness of the threat of global warming (albeit with caveats about proof) and therefore found that the presentation of Professor Wunsch's views, within the wider context of the programme, resulted in unfairness to him.
- However, Ofcom did not uphold Wunsch's complaint that the programme misrepresented his views in relation to the oceans and CO_{2}:
  The Committee noted from the unedited interview that Professor Wunsch had referred to the greenhouse effect on a couple of occasions. However, in the Committee’s opinion Professor Wunsch's comments in this respect had not been primarily to warn of the dangers of warming the ocean (as Professor Wunsch had suggested in his complaint). Rather the references had been used to make the point that the relationship between carbon dioxide and atmospheric temperature is complicated. In the Committee’s view, it was entirely at the programme maker's editorial discretion to decide whether to include these comments in the programme.

==== Eigil Friis-Christensen ====
Eigil Friis-Christensen's research was used to support claims about the influence of solar activity on climate, both in the programme and Durkin's subsequent defence of it. Friis-Christensen, with environmental Research Fellow Nathan Rive, criticised the way the solar data were used:

We have concerns regarding the use of a graph featured in the documentary titled 'Temp & Solar Activity 400 Years'. Firstly, we have reason to believe that parts of the graph were made up of fabricated data that were presented as genuine. The inclusion of the artificial data is both misleading and pointless. Secondly, although the narrator commentary during the presentation of the graph is consistent with the conclusions of the paper from which the figure originates, it incorrectly rules out a contribution by anthropogenic greenhouse gases to 20th century global warming.

In response to a question from The Independent as to whether the programme was scientifically accurate, Friis-Christensen said: "No, I think several points were not explained in the way that I, as a scientist, would have explained them ... it is obvious it's not accurate."

Following Eigil Friis-Christensen's criticism of the 'Temp & Solar Activity 400 Years' graph used in the programme (for perfectly matching the lines in the 100 years 1610–1710 where data did not in fact exist in the original), Durkin emailed Friis-Christensen to thank him for highlighting the error: "it is an annoying mistake which all of us missed and is being fixed for all future transmissions of the film. It doesn't alter our argument".

=== Reaction in the British media ===
The documentary received substantial coverage in the British press, both before and after it was broadcast.

Environmentalist and political activist George Monbiot, writing for The Guardian before the programme was shown, discussed the arguments for and against the "hockey stick graph" used in An Inconvenient Truth, saying that the criticism of it has been "debunked". He also highlighted Durkin's previous documentary Against Nature, where the Independent Television Commission found that four complainants had been "misled" and their views were "distorted by selective editing". After the programme was shown, Monbiot wrote another article arguing that it was based on already debunked science, and he accused Channel 4 of being more interested in generating controversy than in producing credible science programmes. Robin McKie, science editor of The Guardian, said the documentary opted "for dishonest rhetoric when a little effort could have produced an important contribution to a critical social problem".

Dominic Lawson, writing in The Independent, was favourable toward the programme, echoing many of its claims and recommending it to the public. He largely focused his attention on the reactions of the environmental community, first at Durkin's earlier production, Against Nature, and now at The Great Global Warming Swindle. Lawson characterised the programme's opponents as being quick to leap to ad hominem attacks about the director's qualifications and political affiliations rather than the merits of his factual claims. Lawson summarised examples from the production of how dissenting scientists are pushed into the background and effectively censored by organisations such as the IPCC. Lawson described the correlation between sunspots and temperature as "striking."

Geoffrey Lean, The Independent's environment editor, was critical of the programme. He noted that Dominic Lawson is the son and brother-in-law, respectively, of two prominent global warming deniers (Nigel Lawson, who is also featured in the programme, and Christopher Monckton), implying that Lawson was not a neutral observer. The Independent mostly disagreed with three of the programme's major claims, for example stating that "recent solar increases are too small to have produced the present warming, and have been much less important than greenhouse gases since about 1850". In a later Independent article, Steve Connor attacked the programme, saying that its makers had selectively used data that was sometimes decades old, and had introduced other serious errors of their own:

The original, and corrected versions of Temperature data from TGGWS, along with NASA GISS data

Mr Durkin admitted that his graphics team had extended the time axis along the bottom of the graph to the year 2000. 'There was a fluff there,' he said. If Mr Durkin had gone directly to the NASA website he could have got the most up-to-date data. This would have demonstrated that the amount of global warming since 1975, as monitored by terrestrial weather stations around the world, has been greater than that between 1900 and 1940—although that would have undermined his argument. 'The original NASA data was very wiggly-lined and we wanted the simplest line we could find,' Mr Durkin said.

Connor also wrote that although the graph in question was attributed to NASA in the film, when he asked Wag TV where the graph really came from, they told him that it had been taken from a paper published in Medical Sentinel. Connor noted that "The authors of the paper are well-known climate sceptics who were funded by the Oregon Institute of Science and Medicine and the George C. Marshall Institute, a right-wing Washington think-tank."

The online magazine Spiked published an interview with Durkin, in which the director complained of how Ofcom censures "seriously controversial work", and that the end result is "phoney controversialism on TV but not much real controversialism". Spiked described the programme's "all-encompassing cosmic ray theory" as "a little unconvincing", but said that "the film poked some very big holes in the global warming consensus", and argued "we could do with more anti-conformist films from 'mavericks' like Durkin".

The Times's science editor Mark Henderson listed a number of points where, in his opinion, "Channel 4 got it wrong over climate change". He highlighted the feedback argument for the ice core data, the measurement error explanation for temperatures in the troposphere, and the sulphate cooling argument for mid-20th century cooling.

Janet Daley, writing in The Daily Telegraph in a column headlined "The Green Lobby Must Not Stifle The Debate", noted that "Among those who attempted to prevent the film being shown at all was the Liberal Democrat spokesman on the environment, Chris Huhne, who, without having seen the programme, wrote to Channel 4 executives advising them in the gravest terms to reconsider their decision to broadcast it".

In response, Huhne sent a letter to The Daily Telegraph about Daley's column, writing "Janet Daley is simply wrong to state that I wrote to Channel 4 'advising them in the gravest terms to reconsider their decision to broadcast' Martin Durkin’s The Great Global Warming Swindle. I wrote asking for Channel 4's comments on the fact—not in dispute—that the last time Mr Durkin ventured onto this territory he suffered serious complaints for sloppy journalism—upheld by the Independent Television Commission—and had to apologise." The Daily Telegraph apologised, saying they were happy to accept that "Mr Huhne's letter was not an attempt to prevent the film being shown or suppress debate on the issue".

=== Other reactions ===
David Miliband, at the time the UK Secretary of State for Environment, Farming and Rural Affairs, presented a rebuttal of the main points of the film on his blog and stated that "there will always be people with conspiracy theories trying to do down the scientific consensus, and that is part of scientific and democratic debate, but the science of climate change looks like fact to me."

Steven Milloy, who runs the website Junkscience.com, endorsed the documentary on 18 March 2007.

The programme has been discussed extensively in Australia, including favourable mentions in an editorial in The Australian and the Counterpoint radio programme presented by Michael Duffy. The Australian stated the film "presents a coherent argument for why governments must hasten slowly in responding". Duffy noted the program's claims regarding Margaret Thatcher. In response, writing in an opinion piece for the Australian Financial Review, John Quiggin criticised the programme for putting forward "conspiracy theories". According to The Australian, scientist Tim Flannery had wondered at a conference whether the programme should be classified as fiction rather than a documentary. In a critical review of the documentary, Barry Brook stated "Amongst the selected contrarian 'experts' Durkin has rallied to his cause, there are Tim Ball and Patrick Michaels (who also happen to deny that CFCs cause damage to the ozone layer), and Fred Singer and Richard Lindzen (who, in earlier incarnations, had been active denialists of the link between passive smoking and lung cancer, despite neither having any medical expertise)."

In the Czech Republic, President Václav Klaus addressed the audience of the first local release of the movie on 28 June 2007. He called the premiere a "meeting of supporters of reason against irrationality" and compared the warnings of scientists against global warming to Communist propaganda. According to Czech news, Klaus—an outspoken critic of scientific consensus on global warming—has been the first head of state to endorse this movie.

In September 2008, Iain Stewart presented a documentary series The Climate Wars covering the climate change debate, in which a clip from Durkin's film showing the link between solar activity and temperature was shown, noting 'it seems a convincing argument!'. Stewart's documentary then showed that the correlation didn't hold if more recent data (available at the time but not used in The Great Global Warming Swindle) was included.

=== Reaction to DVD release ===
Thirty-seven climate scientists wrote a letter urging Martin Durkin to drop plans to release a DVD of the film. In the letter they say Durkin "misrepresented both the scientific evidence and the interpretations of researchers." Durkin said in response: "The reason they want to suppress The Great Global Warming Swindle is because the science has stung them". He acknowledged two of the errors mentioned by the scientists—including the claim about volcanic emissions—but he described those changes as minor and said they would be corrected in the expanded DVD release.

In response to the call by these scientists not to market a DVD of the film, Times columnist Mick Hume, described environmentalism as a "new religion", saying "Scientists have become the equivalent of high priests in white coats, summoned to condemn heretics".

The DVD was released in the UK on 30 September 2007. Christopher Monckton, a prominent British global warming sceptic, is funding the distribution of the documentary in English schools as a riposte to Al Gore's An Inconvenient Truth, which is also being shown in schools.

=== Durkin's response to critics ===
On 17 March 2007, The Daily Telegraph published a response by Durkin, "The global-warmers were bound to attack, but why are they so feeble?" In it, he rejected any criticism of the alleged close correlation between solar variation and temperature change, claiming that "No one any longer seriously disputes the link between solar activity and temperature in earth's climate history." He accepted that the time axis of one graph was incorrectly labelled when the programme was first transmitted, but said that this does not change his conclusions. Regarding the Carl Wunsch controversy (see above), he repeated his claim that Wunsch was not duped into taking part in the programme. (Ofcom later ruled against Durkin on this point.)

Durkin went on to reject his opponents' position that the cooling period observed post Second World War was caused by sulfate aerosol cooling: "Thanks to China and the rest, SO_{2} levels are far, far higher now than they were back then. Why isn't it perishing cold?" He concluded by saying that the "global warming alarm...is wrong, wrong, wrong."

Commenting at a Cannes film festival press conference on 17 April 2007, Durkin noted: "My name is absolute mud on the Internet; it's really vicious," adding "There is no good scientific basis for it but the theory continues to hold sway because so many people have built their careers and reputations on it."

=== The Armand Leroi correspondence ===
The Times reported that Durkin had seriously fallen out with a scientist who had been considering working with him. Armand Leroi, a geneticist, was concerned that Durkin had used data about a correlation between solar activity and global temperatures that was subsequently found to be flawed. Leroi sent Durkin an e-mail in which he said that he thought the programme "made some good points (the politics of the IPCC) and some bad points (anthropogenic global warming is a conspiracy to keep Africa underdeveloped)," but said what had most interested him were some of the scientific claims about solar activity and global temperature. He said he looked for citations of the 1991 Friis-Christensen scientific paper used in the programme.

While Leroi acknowledged "I am no climate scientist," he said that after reviewing criticisms of the paper, he had become convinced that: "To put this bluntly: the data that you showed in your programme were wrong–and may have been deliberately faked... it does show what abundant experience has already taught me–that, left to their own devices, TV producers simply cannot be trusted to tell the truth."

Leroi copied the e-mail to other parties including The Guardian journalist and Bad Science columnist Ben Goldacre and science writer and mathematics expert Simon Singh. Durkin replied to all with the single sentence: "You’re a big daft cock". Singh then sent an email to Durkin that said: "I have not paid the same attention to your programme as Armand has done, but from what I did see it is an irresponsible piece of film-making. If you can send me a copy of the programme then I will examine it in more detail and give you a more considered response...it would be great if you could engage in the debate rather just resorting to one line replies".

Durkin responded: "The IPCC's own figures show the hottest year in the past ten was 1998, and the temp has been flat-lining now for five years. If it's greenhouse gas causing the warming the rate of warming should be higher in the troposphere than on the surface. The opposite is the case. The ice core data shows that temperature change causes the level of atmospheric CO_{2} to change — not the other way round. Why have we not heard this in the hours and hours of shit programming on global warming shoved down our throats by the BBC?", and concluded with, "Never mind a bit of irresponsible film-making. Go and fuck yourself". Durkin later apologised for his language, saying that he had sent the e-mails when tired and had just finished making the programme, and that he was "eager to have all the science properly debated with scientists qualified in the right areas".

== Ofcom investigation ==
=== Ruling ===
In an 8400-word official judgement issued on 21 July 2008 the British media regulator Ofcom declared that the final part of the film dealing with the politics of climate change had broken rules on "due impartiality on matters of major political and industrial controversy and major matters relating to current public policy". Ofcom also backed complaints by Sir David King, stating that his views were misrepresented, and Carl Wunsch, on the points that he had been misled as to its intent, and that the impression had been given that he agreed with the programme's position on climate change. Ofcom further ruled that the IPCC had not been given an adequate chance to respond to adverse claims that its work was politicised and that it had made misleading claims about malaria. However, the regulator said that because "the link between human activity and global warming... became settled before March 2007", in parts 1–4 the audience was not "materially misled so as to cause harm or offence". According to Ofcom the program caused no harm because "the discussion about the causes of global warming was to a very great extent settled by the date of broadcast", meaning that climate change was no longer a matter of political controversy.

Channel 4 said in its defence against the complaints that The Great Global Warming Swindle "was clearly identified as an authored polemic of the kind that is characteristic of some of Channel 4’s output", and Ofcom said in its decision that it was "of paramount importance that broadcasters, such as Channel 4, continue to explore controversial subject matter". Ofcom declined to rule on the accuracy of the programme, saying: "It is not within Ofcom's remit or ability in this case as the regulator of the 'communications industry' to establish or seek to adjudicate on 'facts' such as whether global warming is a man-made phenomenon." It noted that it only regulates "misleading material where that material is likely to cause harm or offence" and "as a consequence, the requirement that content must not materially mislead the audience is necessarily a high test."

The regulator ruled that the parts of the programme about the scientific debate "were not matters of political or industrial controversy or matters relating to public policy and therefore the rules on due impartiality did not apply." In the fifth segment of the programme concerning the political controversy and public policy, however, Ofcom ruled that the programme-makers were "required to include an appropriate wide range of the significant views" but "failed to do this." Channel 4 was required to broadcast a summary of the Ofcom ruling but was given no further sanctions.

=== General responses ===
Robert Watson, a former chair of the IPCC, also welcomed Ofcom's ruling that the film had committed a number of breaches of the broadcasting code but expressed disappointment "that Ofcom did not find that the programme materially misled the audience as to cause harm or offence." He characterised the film as inaccurate, not impartial, unbalanced and misrepresentative of the scientific consensus on climate change. Another former IPCC chair, Sir John Houghton, likewise commented that "it's very disappointing that Ofcom hasn't come up with a stronger statement about being misled." Bob Ward, the former head of media at the Royal Society, who played a major role in coordinating objections to the film, asserted that "the programme has been let off the hook on a highly questionable technicality", noting that although the ruling acknowledged that "Channel 4 had admitted errors in the graphs and data used in the programme", the regulator had nonetheless "...decided that this did not cause harm or offence to the audience."

Rajendra K. Pachauri, the former chair of the IPCC, welcomed the ruling as "a vindication of the credibility and standing of the IPCC and the manner in which we function, and [it] clearly brings out the distortion in whatever Channel 4 was trying to project." The Royal Society's head, Lord Rees, issued a statement in response to the ruling, commenting: "TV companies occasionally commission programmes just to court controversy, but to misrepresent the evidence on an issue as important as global warming was surely irresponsible. 'The Great Global Warming Swindle' was itself a swindle. The programme makers misrepresented the science, the views of some of the scientists featured in the programme and the work of the Intergovernmental Panel on Climate Change."

=== Channel Four's response ===
The ruling was welcomed by Channel 4's Head of Documentaries, Hamish Mykura who commissioned the film stating the channel was "pleased" that Ofcom found the film did not "materially mislead the audience."

When questioned by television industry e-zine C21 about Ofcom's finding against the channel Mykura said:

It has scrutinised the documentary in great detail over 16 months. Any film scrutinised for that long would have revealed some factual inaccuracies, but crucially, it's said that what it found was not of a significant magnitude to materially mislead the viewer. It said that there were some things that weren't right, but ultimately it has exonerated us.

While he said that he regretted that 'there were some breaches of the code' he said there was "a degree" to which he disagreed with the complaints they upheld:

On the complaint from Sir David King, there was a quote by a contributor in the film that was wrong, which he had wrongly picked up from someone else and was quoting. On the second point regarding the IPCC, Ofcom decided that we didn't give it enough time to respond to the allegations presented. We gave them 10 days, so you can decide as to whether you feel that's enough time. And on the complaint from Carl Wunsch, he complained that we hadn't made it significantly clear he would be appearing on a polemic climate change programme. But we told him we were going to explore the issues of the counter argument to global warming and he got the same letter as everyone else, and no-one else claimed they didn't know what they'd be appearing on.

== Awards and recognition ==
- Shortlisted in the Best Documentary category in the British television industry's 2008 Broadcast awards.
- Best Documentary at the Io Isabella International Film Week held in southern Italy.
- Jury's Special Mention for courageous contribution to the scientific dialogue and for the quality of cinematography in the 3rd International Science Film Festival Awards 2008 held in Athens.

== Contributors ==
The film includes appearances from the following individuals:

- Syun-Ichi Akasofu – Professor and director, International Arctic Research Center, 1998 to 2007
- Tim Ball – Public speaker who worked with Friends of Science and the Natural Resources Stewardship Project (Misidentified in the film as professor from the Department of Climatology, University of Winnipeg. Ball left the Department of Geography in 1996; the University of Winnipeg has never had a Department of Climatology.)
- Nigel Calder – Former editor, New Scientist, 1962 to 1966
- John Christy – Professor, Department of Atmospheric Science, University of Alabama in Huntsville and lead author of Chapter 2 of the IPCC Third Assessment Report (Credited in the film as 'a Lead Author, IPCC')
- Ian Clark – Professor, Department of Earth Sciences, University of Ottawa
- Piers Corbyn – Weather forecaster, anti-vaccine activist, Weather Action
- Paul Driessen – Author of Eco-Imperialism: Green Power, Black Death (2003) and lobbyist
- Eigil Friis-Christensen – Director, Danish National Space Center and adjunct professor, University of Copenhagen (who has since criticised the programme for fabricating data and not fully explaining his position on 20th-century global warming).
- Nigel Lawson – Former UK Chancellor of the Exchequer, 1983 to 1989
- Richard Lindzen – Professor, Department of Meteorology, MIT
- Patrick Michaels – Research professor, Department of Environmental Sciences, University of Virginia
- Patrick Moore – Industry consultant and former Greenpeace Canada president
- Paul Reiter – Professor, Department of Medical Entomology, Pasteur Institute, Paris
- Nir Shaviv – Professor, Institute of Physics, Hebrew University of Jerusalem
- James Shikwati – Libertarian economist, author, and CEO of The African Executive
- Frederick Singer – Professor emeritus, Department of Environmental Sciences, University of Virginia (Misidentified in the film as former director, U.S. National Weather Service. From 1962–64 he was Director of the National Weather Satellite Service)
- Roy Spencer – Meteorologist and researcher, University of Alabama in Huntsville
- Philip Stott – Professor emeritus, Department of Biogeography, University of London
- Carl Wunsch – Professor, Department of Oceanography, MIT (who has since repudiated the programme)
- Bert Bolin - Professor of Meteorology at Stockholm University from 1961 until his retirement in 1990.

== Related programmes and films ==
- Against Nature: An earlier controversial Channel 4 programme made by Martin Durkin, which was also critical of the environmental movement and was charged by the Independent Television Commission of the UK for misrepresenting and distorting the views of interviewees by selective editing
- An Inconvenient Truth: A film that showcases Al Gore's presentation on global warming, arguing that humans are the primary cause of recent climate change
- Cool It: A documentary film that also denies climate change.
- The Greenhouse Conspiracy: An earlier Channel 4 documentary broadcast on 12 August 1990, as part of the Equinox series, in which similar claims were made. Three of the people interviewed (Lindzen, Michaels and Spencer) were also interviewed in The Great Global Warming Swindle
- The Denial Machine: A 2007 Canadian Broadcasting Corporation documentary "how fossil fuel corporations have kept the global warming debate alive long after most scientists believed that global warming was real and had potentially catastrophic consequences". Many interviewees from The Great Global Warming Swindle appeared in—and were the subject of—this film.
- Doomsday Called Off: A 2005 Canadian Broadcasting Corporation expose raising many of the same criticisms of anthropogenic global warming. It includes interviews with several sources of information used, but not interviewed, in The Great Global Warming Swindle (among whom are Willie Soon and Sallie Baliunas).

== International distribution ==
The documentary has been sold to Sweden's TV4, (who aired it in April 2007) Denmark's DR2, Germany's RTL (on 11 June 2007) and n-TV (on 7 July 2007), Finland's MTV3 (on 7 October 2007) and Hong Kong's TVB Pearl (on 16 November 2007). Negotiations are underway with the United States network ABC and France's TF1.

A modified version (running time 55 minutes) of the documentary was shown in Germany. Many interviews were cut out, with others replaced by German speaking interview partners, and some claims were abandoned or changed. For example, the reference to Margaret Thatcher was replaced by the claim that Helmut Schmidt promoted climate change to justify the construction of nuclear power plants in Germany. The programme on RTL was followed by a discussion roundtable.

A shortened version, excluding the interview with Carl Wunsch and claims about volcanoes, among other material, was shown by the Australian Broadcasting Corporation on 12 July 2007. The Australian reported that this was "against the advice of ABC science journalist Robyn Williams, who instructed the ABC Television not to buy the program." Williams described the programme as "demonstrably wrong", and claimed that the ABC board had put pressure on ABC TV director Kim Dalton to show the programme. Dalton defended the decision, saying "[Durkin's] thesis is way outside the scientific mainstream. But that's no reason to keep his views away from audiences"

The broadcast was followed by an interview between Durkin and ABC reporter Tony Jones, in which Jones challenged Durkin on a number of points, including the accuracy of graphs used in the program, criticism of the program's claims by climate scientists, its allegation of a conspiracy theory and the claims of misrepresentation by Carl Wunsch. This was followed by a panel discussion, including participation from a studio audience. Lateline, which followed, included an interview with Wunsch. (See Carl Wunsch section for full details.)

=== New Zealand broadcast ===
A version of The Great Global Warming Swindle (edited by Durkin to remove errors) was broadcast in New Zealand on Prime TV, 8:40 pm, 1 June 2008. Following the program there was an hour-long panel discussion, moderated by Prime presenter Eric Young, including the following people:

- David Wratt—NIWA General Manager
- Leighton Smith—climate change sceptic and radio talkshow host
- Willem De Lange—Senior Lecturer, Department of Earth & Ocean Sciences – University of Waikato
- Cindy Baxter—Greenpeace Climate change consultant
- Martin Manning—Professor and Research Fellow in Climate Change at the Victoria University, Climate Change Research Institute

Manning and Wratt stated that the IPCC reports represented the well documented consensus amongst the scientific community that climate change was a real phenomenon and that human activities, including CO_{2} emissions, were the most likely cause.

Smith disputed that there was evidence that CO_{2} caused temperature rises. He referred further science issues to de Lange. Smith made several references to the many scientists whose research and publications refuted the human causes of climate change, however no details were provided.

Baxter was supportive of the IPCC consensus. She reminded the group on several occasions that there were several known funding connections between the groups most vocal in raising doubts about CO_{2} and large industrial companies (such as ExxonMobil).

At the end of the session, two different graphs were shown with more recent data than that used in The Great Global Warming Swindle.

== See also ==
- Climate change denial
- The Cloud Mystery
- Global warming controversy
- Climate change conspiracy theory
- Not Evil Just Wrong
- Politics of global warming

== Bibliography ==
- Booker, Christopher (2009). The Real Global Warming Disaster. Continuum International Publishing Group Ltd. ISBN 978-1-4411-1052-7.
