= The Cloud Mystery =

2008 documentary directed by Lars Oxfeldt

- Written by: Lars Mortensen
- Directed by: Lars Mortensen
- Country of origin: Denmark
- Original language: English

Production
- Running time: 52 minutes
- Production company: Mortensen Film

Original release
- Release: 2008

The Cloud Mystery is a documentary by Danish director Lars Oxfeldt Mortensen. It explores the theory by Danish scientist Henrik Svensmark on how galactic cosmic rays and solar activity affects cloud cover, and how this influences the Earth's climate. Also known as Klimamysteriet in Danish.

This documentary presents the work done to develop the theory that cloud cover change is caused by variations in cosmic rays as the major originator of global climate variation. It also mentions that these scientists do not subscribe to the scientific consensus on climate change, which says that human influence and the effect of greenhouse gases are significant drivers of climate. However, the focus is on the work they have done and not on the consensus on anthropogenic global warming.

== Release ==
The Cloud Mystery aired on TV2 (Denmark) in early 2008. It was also shown on Norway's NRK and on TV4 Fakta, (which can be viewed in Sweden and Finland.) and on Arte (April 2. 2010, "Das Geheimnis der Wolken") in Germany.

== Opinions ==
Danish engineering trade weekly Ingenøren found that the documentary gave a sober overview of Henrik Svensmarks theory, though it lacked scientific criticism.

The documentary sparked a debate between supporters of the scientific consensus that carbon dioxide is the prime cause of global warming, and opponents. However, the scientific results of Svensmark and Nir Shaviv, two of the protagonists, forming the basis of the documentary, have been criticized by Mike Lockwood and Claus Froehlich (see Galactic Cosmic Rays vs Global Temperature).

== See also ==
- Cosmic rays – Postulated role in climate change
- Milky Way
- Barred spiral galaxy
- Cloud condensation nuclei
- The Chilling Stars
- The Great Global Warming Swindle
