= The Chilling Stars =

2003 book by Henrik Svensmark and Nigel Calder

- Author: Henrik Svensmark and Nigel Calder
- Language: English
- Genre: Non-fiction
- Media type: Print (Hardback & Paperback)
- ISBN: 1-84046-815-7

The Chilling Stars is a non-fiction book about the possible causes and effects of global climate change by Henrik Svensmark and Nigel Calder. The paperback version was published by Totem Books on March 19, 2003. An updated version titled The Chilling Stars: A New Theory of Climate Change was published in 2007. Svensmark is otherwise known as a Danish physicist and professor, while Calder had worked as a science journalist.

The authors argue that cloud cover changes caused by variations in cosmic rays are a major contributor to global temperature increases, and they state that human influences have been exaggerated.

== Contents and background ==
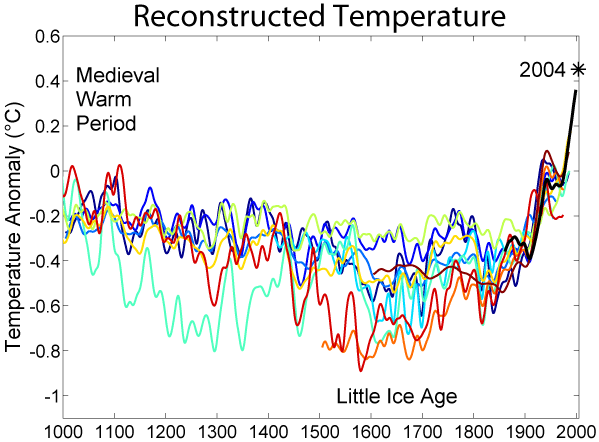
This graph depicts several estimates of world temperature variation over the last millennium.

The authors describe a cross-disciplinary theory that takes in elements of cosmology, particle physics, paleo-climatology, and meteorology. They label their concept 'cosmoclimatology', and they attempt to look back through prior climate trends such as the Medieval Warm Period and the Little Ice Age. They detail what they view as a close correlation between the rate of cosmic rays reaching the Earth, which varies based on electromagnetic fluctuation on the Sun's surface, and the Earth's temperature.

They write how the solar magnetic field grew over twice as strong as before over the 20th century, and they peg this as a primary driver of the approximately 0.6 °C warming over that time. Specifically, they state that fewer cosmic rays cause fewer clouds to form, and thus the climate becomes hotter, given that the individual water droplets that make up clouds collect when cosmic particles turn water into ions.

== Reviews ==
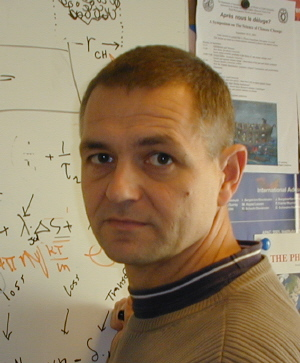
Henrik Svensmark

The online magazine londonbookreview.com remarked, "For those who believe that the argument about the causes of climate change have been settled may find this a difficult book to read. But those who retain an open mind may find this an interesting read, even if it is only to confirm that the science is far from being settled."

Scientists have generally not found the published work of Svensmark et al. persuasive. For example, Lockwood et al. find that "The cloud-cosmic ray suggestion increasingly fails to match observations". A joint Spanish/Japanese collaboration of solar ray/astrophysics experts found that the change in global cloud cover is closely correlated with El Niño–Southern Oscillation and uncorrelated with solar rays.

Other scientists have vigorously criticized Svensmark for sloppy and inconsistent work: one example is adjustment of cloud data that understates error in lower cloud data, but not in high cloud data; another example is "incorrect handling of the physical data" resulting in graphs that do not show the correlations they claim to show. Despite Svensmark's assertions, galactic cosmic rays have shown no statistically significant influence on changes in cloud cover, and have been demonstrated in studies to have no causal relationship to changes in global temperature.

== See also ==
- Scientific opinion on climate change
- The Great Global Warming Swindle
- The Cloud Mystery
