= Ján Veizer =

Canadian geochemist

- Born: 22 June 1941 (age 85); Slovakia
- Scientific career
- Fields: Geochemistry
- Workplaces: University of Ottawa

Ján Veizer (born 22 June 1941) is a Slovak-Canadian geochemist. He is the Distinguished University Professor (emeritus) of Earth Sciences at the University of Ottawa and Institute for Geology, Mineralogy and Geophysics, of Bochum Ruhr University. He held the NSERC/Noranda/CIFAR Industrial Chair in Earth System Isotope and Environmental Geochemistry until 2004. He is an isotope geochemist; his research interests have included the use of chemical and isotopic techniques in determining Earth's climatic and environmental history.

Born in Pobedim, Slovakia, Veizer has received the Killam Award (Canada Council, 1986), the 1987 W.W. Hutchison Medal for young individuals making exceptional advances in Canadian earth science research; the 1991 Willet G. Miller Medal for outstanding contributions in geology; the 1992 Gottfried Wilhelm Leibniz Prize, which carried a 1.55 million euro value, awarded for understanding of the geochemistry of sediments; the 1995 Logan Medal which is the Geological Association of Canada's highest honour; the 2000 Bancroft Award for contributions furthering the public understanding of the Earth sciences.

== Cosmic rays and climate change ==
In a letter to Nature, Veizer et al.(2000), compared the reconstruction of tropical sea surface temperatures throughout the Phanerozoic eon (the past ~550 Myr) with the variable galactic cosmic rays and concluded that their results can be reconciled if atmospheric carbon dioxide concentrations were not the principal driver of climate variability on geological timescales for at least one-third of the Phanerozoic eon, or if the reconstructed carbon dioxide concentrations are not reliable.

In 2003, together with Nir J. Shaviv, an Israeli astrophysicist, Veizer published a paper in GSA Today suggesting a reduced (capped) influence of carbon dioxide to climate change and attributing a more significant influence to cosmic rays. Veizer and Shaviv commented that their model on a doubled carbon dioxide content in the last century would result in a warming of 1.5 °C, according to Veizer and Shaviv in line with the minimum level of the IPCC estimate between 1.5 and 4.5 °C.

However, the paper was criticized by a subsequent publication in 2004 by Stefan Rahmstorf and other climate scientists in the journal Eos (American Geophysical Union), in which the authors wrote, "The correlation of CRF [cosmic ray flux] and climate over the past 520 m.y. appears to not hold up under scrutiny".

== Selected publications ==
- Veizer, Ján; Hoefs, Jochen (1976). "The nature of O18/O16 and C13/C12 secular trends in sedimentary carbonate rocks". Geochimica et Cosmochimica Acta. 40 (11). Elsevier BV: 1387–1395. Bibcode:1976GeCoA..40.1387V. doi:10.1016/0016-7037(76)90129-0. ISSN 0016-7037.
- Veizer, Ján; Jansen, Siegfried L. (1979). "Basement and Sedimentary Recycling and Continental Evolution". The Journal of Geology. 87 (4). University of Chicago Press: 341–370. Bibcode:1979JG.....87..341V. doi:10.1086/628425. ISSN 0022-1376. S2CID 140673989.
- Brand, Uwe; Veizer, Jan (1980). "Chemical Diagenesis of a Multicomponent Carbonate System--1: Trace Elements". SEPM Journal of Sedimentary Research. 50. Society for Sedimentary Geology. doi:10.1306/212f7bb7-2b24-11d7-8648000102c1865d. ISSN 1527-1404.
- Veizer, Ján (31 December 1983). "Chapter 8. TRACE ELEMENTS and ISOTOPES in SEDIMENTARY CARBONATES". Carbonates. De Gruyter. pp. 265–300. doi:10.1515/9781501508134-012. ISBN 978-1-5015-0813-4.
- Veizer, Ján; Ala, Davin; Azmy, Karem; Bruckschen, Peter; Buhl, Dieter; Bruhn, Frank; Carden, Giles A.F.; Diener, Andreas; Ebneth, Stefan; Godderis, Yves; Jasper, Torsten; Korte, Christoph; Pawellek, Frank; Podlaha, Olaf G.; Strauss, Harald (1999). "87Sr/86Sr, δ13C and δ18O evolution of Phanerozoic seawater". Chemical Geology. 161 (1–3). Elsevier BV: 59–88. Bibcode:1999ChGeo.161...59V. doi:10.1016/s0009-2541(99)00081-9. ISSN 0009-2541.
- Veizer, Ján; Godderis, Yves; François, Louis M. (2000). "Evidence for decoupling of atmospheric CO2 and global climate during the Phanerozoic eon". Nature. 408 (6813). Springer Science and Business Media LLC: 698–701. Bibcode:2000Natur.408..698V. doi:10.1038/35047044. ISSN 0028-0836. PMID 11130067. S2CID 4372892.
- Veizer, J. (2005). Celestial climate driver: a perspective from four billion years of the carbon cycle. Geoscience Canada, 32, 13-28.
- Ferguson, Paul R.; Veizer, Ján (20 December 2007). "Coupling of water and carbon fluxes via the terrestrial biosphere and its significance to the Earth's climate system". Journal of Geophysical Research. 112 (D24). American Geophysical Union (AGU). Bibcode:2007JGRD..11224S06F. doi:10.1029/2007jd008431. ISSN 0148-0227.
- Korte, Christoph; Jones, Peter J.; Brand, Uwe; Mertmann, Dorothee; Veizer, Ján (2008). "Oxygen isotope values from high-latitudes: Clues for Permian sea-surface temperature gradients and Late Palaeozoic deglaciation". Palaeogeography, Palaeoclimatology, Palaeoecology. 269 (1–2). Elsevier BV: 1–16. Bibcode:2008PPP...269....1K. doi:10.1016/j.palaeo.2008.06.012. ISSN 0031-0182.
- Shaviv, Nir J.; Veizer, Ján (2003), "Celestial driver of Phanerozoic climate?", GSA Today, 13 (7): 4–10, doi:10.1130/1052-5173(2003)013<0004:CDOPC>2.0.CO;2
- Scherer, K.; Fichtner, H.; Borrmann, T.; Beer, J.; Desorgher, L.; Flükiger, E.; Fahr, H.-J.; Ferreira, S. E. S.; Langner, U. W.; Potgieter, M. S.; Heber, B.; Masarik, J.; Shaviv, N.; Veizer, J. (31 January 2007). "Interstellar-Terrestrial Relations: Variable Cosmic Environments, The Dynamic Heliosphere, and Their Imprints on Terrestrial Archives and Climate". Space Science Reviews. 127 (1–4). Springer Science and Business Media LLC: 327–465. doi:10.1007/s11214-006-9126-6. ISSN 0038-6308. S2CID 119640116.
