= Nigel Calder =

British science writer

The Honourable Nigel Calder
- Born: Nigel David McKail Ritchie-Calder; 2 December 1931; United Kingdom
- Died: 25 June 2014 (aged 82)
- Education: Sidney Sussex College, Cambridge
- Occupation: Science writer
- Children: 2 sons (including Simon Calder), 3 daughters
- Parent(s): Peter Ritchie Calder; Mabel Jane Forbes McKail
- Relatives: Angus Calder (brother)

Nigel David McKail Ritchie-Calder (2 December 1931 – 25 June 2014) was a British science writer and climate change skeptic.

== Early life ==
Nigel Calder was born on 2 December 1931. His father was Ritchie Calder. His mother was Mabel Jane Forbes McKail. He had four siblings, including historian Angus Calder (1942–2008), mathematician Allan Calder and educationist Isla Calder (1946–2000). He was educated at Merchant Taylors' School, Northwood and Sidney Sussex College, Cambridge.

== Career ==
Between 1956 and 1966, Calder wrote for the magazine New Scientist, serving as editor from 1962 until 1966. After that, he worked as an independent author and TV screenwriter. He conceived and scripted thirteen major documentaries and series concerning popular science subjects broadcast by the BBC and Channel 4 (London), with accompanying books. For his television work he received the Kalinga Prize for the Popularization of Science during 1972. During 2004, his book Magic Universe was shortlisted for The Aventis Prizes for Science Books.

Calder said that climate change science has been invaded by sophistry about man-made global warming. As late as 1980, he was still predicting that by 2030 "the much-advertised heating of the earth by the man-made carbon-dioxide 'greenhouse' [will fail] to occur; instead, there [will be] renewed concern about cooling and an impending ice age".

Calder participated in making the film The Great Global Warming Swindle. He also co-authored The Chilling Stars. Regarding global warming, Calder stated: "Governments are trying to achieve unanimity by stifling any scientist who disagrees. Einstein could not have got funding under the present system."

The claims made in The Chilling Stars have been rejected by a number of scientific studies. For example, Lockwood et al. find that "The cloud-cosmic ray suggestion increasingly fails to match observations". A joint Spanish/Japanese collaboration of solar ray/astrophysics experts found that the change in global cloud cover is closely correlated with El Niño–Southern Oscillation and uncorrelated with solar rays.

== Personal life ==
His wife (Elisabeth Palmer) was formerly an adviser on language teaching for the London Chamber of Commerce. They had two sons, including travel writer Simon Calder, and three daughters.

=== Death ===
Calder died in Crawley, West Sussex, England on 25 June 2014, aged 82.

== Works ==
- 1957 Electricity Grows Up—author, for Phoenix
- 1957 Robots—author, for Phoenix
- 1958 Radio Astronomy—author, for Phoenix
- 1965 The World in 1984—editor, for Penguin etc.
- 1967 The Environment Game—author, for Secker, Holt, etc.
- 1968 Unless Peace Comes—editor, for Allen Lane, Viking etc.
- 1969 The Violent Universe—author, for BBC, Viking, etc.
- 1969 Technopolis—author, for McGibbon & Kee, Shuster, etc.
- 1970 The Mind of Man—author, for BBC, Viking, etc.
- 1970 Living Tomorrow—author, for Penguin Education
- 1972 The Restless Earth—author, for BBC, Viking, etc.
- 1973 Nature in the Round—editor, for Weidenfeld
- 1973 The Life Game—author, for BBC, Viking, etc.
- 1974 The Weather Machine—author, for BBC, Viking, etc.
- 1976 The Human Conspiracy—author, for BBC, Viking, etc.
- 1977 The Key to the Universe—author, for BBC, Viking, etc.
- 1978 Spaceships of the Mind—author, for BBC, Viking, etc.
- 1979 Einstein's Universe—author, for BBC, Viking, etc. – reissued 2005
- 1979 Nuclear Nightmares—author, for BBC, Viking, etc.
- 1980 The Comet is Coming!—author, for BBC, Viking, etc. – reissued 1994
- 1983 Timescale: Atlas of the Fourth Dimension—author, for Viking etc.
- 1983 1984 and Beyond—author, for Century and Viking
- 1986 The English Channel—author, for Viking and Chatto
- 1986 The Green Machines—author, for Putnam, etc.
- 1988 Future Earth—a contributing editor, for Croom-Helm, etc.
- 1990 Scientific Europe—general editor, for Foundation Scientific Europe
- 1991 Spaceship Earth—author, for Viking UK etc.
- 1992 Giotto mission to the Comets—author, for Presswork and Springer
- 1993 Hubble Space Telescope: The Harvest So Far—author, for European Space Agency
- 1994 Comets: Speculations and Science—reissue by Dover of The Comet is Coming!
- 1995 Beyond This World—author, for European Space Agency
- 1997 The Manic Sun—author, for Pilkington Press etc.
- 1999 Success Story: 30 Discoveries—compiler, for European Space Agency
- 2003 Magic Universe: The Oxford Guide to Modern Science—author, for Oxford UP, etc.
- 2005 Einstein’s Universe (updated for Einstein Year) – author, for Penguin UK & US, etc.
- 2005 Albert Einstein: Relativity – introduction to a Penguin Classic, Penguin US
- 2007 The Chilling Stars – joint author with Henrik Svensmark for Icon Books, etc.
