= Kenneth Brecher =

American astronomer

Kenneth Brecher (born December 7, 1943) is an American professor of astronomy and physics, emeritus at Boston University, with a focus on high-energy astrophysics, relativity, and cosmology. His wife, Aviva Brecher, is also a physicist.

== Early life and education ==
Kenneth Brecher was born on December 7, 1943, to a Jewish family in Queens, New York. The son of Irving and Edythe Brecher, he had two brothers. His parents co-owned Camp Winneshewauka, a summer camp in Vermont, where Brecher spent many summers before he graduated from Great Neck North Senior High School in 1961.

Brecher attended the Massachusetts Institute of Technology, earning his SB in physics in 1964 in 3 years. He stayed at MIT to earn his physics PhD in 1969 with professor Philip Morrison. He did postdoctoral work at the University of California, San Diego in physics from 1969 to 1972 with professor Geoffrey Burbidge. He met his wife, Aviva Brecher, during a summer doing research with professor Nathan Rosen at the Technion – Israel Institute of Technology in Haifa, Israel.

== Career and later life ==
Brecher's astrophysical research interests center on a range of topics in theoretical high-energy astrophysics including neutron stars, pulsars, x-ray binary sources, supernovae, and gamma-ray bursters. He has been engaged in several materials, software, hardware, and curriculum development projects for use in K-12, undergraduate, and informal science education. He was the principal investigator on "Project LITE: Light Inquiry Through Experiments", which developed extensive array of hands-on and eyes-on educational software and materials about light, optics, color, and visual perception. He was the founding Director of the Boston University Science and Mathematics Education Center, which ran for 24 years and which developed educational curricula, trained teachers, and encouraged K-12 students to pursue careers in science and mathematics.

Brecher was co-initiator and project scientist on the Harvard University's "MicroObservatory Project", which has developed a network of automated astronomical telescopes for student use. He has also worked on the history of astronomy, archaeoastronomy, and the application of early astronomical records to modern astrophysical problems. He was a co-founder of the Historical Astronomy Division of the American Astronomical Society, with John A. Eddy and Owen Gingerich.

Brecher's early work on Einstein's Theory of Relativity earned him an appearance in the 1979 film Einstein's Universe, narrated by Peter Ustinov with explanations of relativity from fellow professors Sidney Drell, Roger Penrose, Wallace Sargent, Dennis Sciama, Irwin Shapiro, and John Archibald Wheeler. The film was first broadcast on the centenary of Albert Einstein's birth: March 14, 1979. Brecher also edited a special volume of Nature in honor of Einstein's centenary. Years later, Brecher proposed the speed of light be named "Einstein's constant".

Brecher has held research fellowships from the John Simon Guggenheim Foundation, the W. K. Kellogg Foundation and from the National Research Council of the US National Academy of Sciences. He was awarded an Osher Fellowship by the San Francisco Exploratorium, where he developed several science exhibits which can be seen there today. Brecher has had a longstanding passion for art and many kinds of "physics toys", including spinning tops and kaleidoscopes. He has shared his love of learning science through the use of hands-on experiences at conferences around the world.

== Books ==
- High Energy Astrophysics and its Relation to Elementary Particle Physics
- Astronomy of the Ancients

== Recognition ==
Brecher holds multiple patents for his unique kinetic physics toys. His design efforts are currently captured under his "Sirius Enigmas" website, and in articles that use those objects for demonstrations of physics principles.

Asteroid 4242 Brecher, discovered in 1981, was named in honor of Brecher and his wife.

=== Honors ===
- Elected Full Member, Society of the Sigma Xi, 1964
- Second Award, Gravity research Foundation Competition, 1969
- Awarded John Simon Guggenheim Memorial Fellowship, 1979
- Awarded National Research Council Senior Research Associateship, 1983
- Listed in American Men and Women of Science Listed in Who's Who in America, 43rd - 67th editions
- Listed in Who's Who in Science and Engineering, 1st - 11th editions
- Listed in Who's Who in American Education, 6th edition
- Elected Fellow of the American Physical Society, 1984
- Awarded W. K. Kellogg National Fellowship, 1985 - 1988
- Appointed to the Massachusetts Council for the Arts and Humanities, 1988 - 1991
- Elected Chairman, Astrophysics Division, American Physical Society, 1990 - 1991
- Award for software in Computers in Physics Ninth Annual Software Competition, 1998
- Bernard Osher Foundation Fellow, Exploratorium, San Francisco, 2000 – 2002
