= Ian Clark (geologist) =

Canadian geologist

Ian D. Clark is a professor emeritus in the Department of Earth Sciences at the University of Ottawa, who has published research on geoscience, groundwater and geochemistry since 1982. His graduate work in isotope hydrogeology was at the University of Waterloo and the University of Paris.

Clark, who is a paleoclimatologist, is among the scientists who reject the mainstream scientific consensus on climate change; in the 2007 UK television documentary The Great Global Warming Swindle, he asserted that changes in global temperature correlate with solar activity, saying "Solar activity of the last hundred years, over the last several hundred years correlates very nicely on a decadal basis, with sea ice and Arctic temperatures." The only paper co-authored by Ian Clark about climate change has been Critical Topics in Global Warming, published by the Fraser Institute, organization that has accepted funding of fossil fuel corporations like ExxonMobil.

== Works ==
- Ian Clark Groundwater Geochemistry and Isotopes, 2015, ISBN 1-56670-249-6
- Ian Clark and Peter Fritz, Environmental Isotopes in Hydrogeology, 1997, ISBN 1-56670-249-6.
- Ian Clark et al., 2015. "Paleozoic-aged microbial methane in an Ordovician shale and carbonate aquiclude of the Michigan Basin, Southwestern Ontario". Organic Geochemistry. 83-84: 118-126.
- Ian Clark et al., 2013. Paleozoic-aged brine and authigenic helium preserved in an Ordovician shale aquiclude. Geology, 41: 951-954
- Ian Clark and B Lauriol, "Aufeis of the Firth River basin, northern Yukon, Canada: insights to permafrost hydrogeology and karst". Arctic and Alpine Research, 29: 240-252, 1997.
- Ian Clark, B Lauriol, L Harwood, M Marschner, "Groundwater Contributions to Discharge in a Permafrost Setting, Big Fish River, NWT, Canada", Arctic, Antarctic, and Alpine Research, 33: 62-69, 2001.
- B Lauriol, ID Clark. An approach to determine the origin and age of massive ice blockage in two Arctic caves, Permafrost and Periglacial Processes, 1993.
- I Clark, B Lauriol, M Marschner, N Sabourin, et al. Endostromatolites from permafrost karst, Yukon, Canada, Canadian Journal of Earth Sciences, 2004.
- D Lacelle, B Lauriol, ID Clark, "Seasonal isotopic imprint in moonmilk from Caverne de l’Ours (Quebec, Canada): implications for climatic reconstruction". Canadian Journal of Earth Science, 41: 1411-1423, 2004.
- ID Clark, L Henderson, J Chappellaz, D Fisher et al., "CO_{2} isotopes as tracers of firn air diffusion and age in an Arctic ice cap with summer melting, Devon Island, Canada". Journal of Geophysical Research 112, D01301, doi:10.1029/2006jD007471, 2007.

== See also ==
- List of University of Waterloo people
