= CLOUD experiment =

Aerosol nucleation experiment at CERN

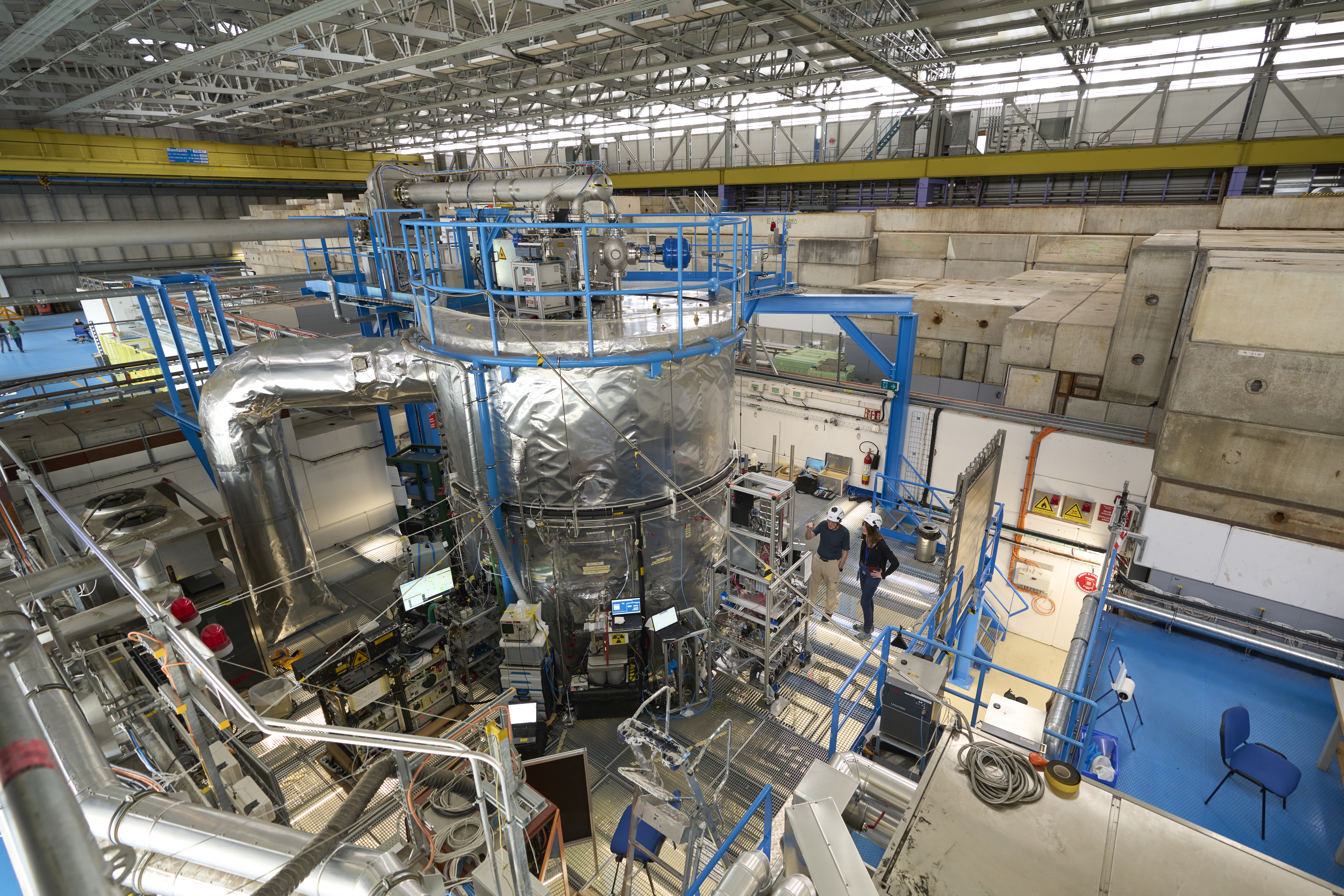
The CLOUD experiment at CERN

Cosmics Leaving Outdoor Droplets (CLOUD) is an experiment being run at CERN by a group of researchers led by Jasper Kirkby to investigate the microphysics between galactic cosmic rays (GCRs) and aerosols under controlled conditions. This is a fixed-target experiment that began operation in November 2009, though it was originally proposed in 2000.

The primary goal is to understand the influence of galactic cosmic rays (GCRs) on aerosols and clouds, and their implications for climate. Although its design is optimised to address the possibility of cosmic rays nucleating cloud particles, (as posed by, for example, Henrik Svensmark and colleagues) CLOUD allows as well to measure aerosol nucleation and growth under controlled laboratory conditions. Atmospheric aerosols and their effect on clouds are recognised by the IPCC as the main source of uncertainty in present radiative forcing and climate models, since an increase in cloud cover reduces global warming.

== Setup ==
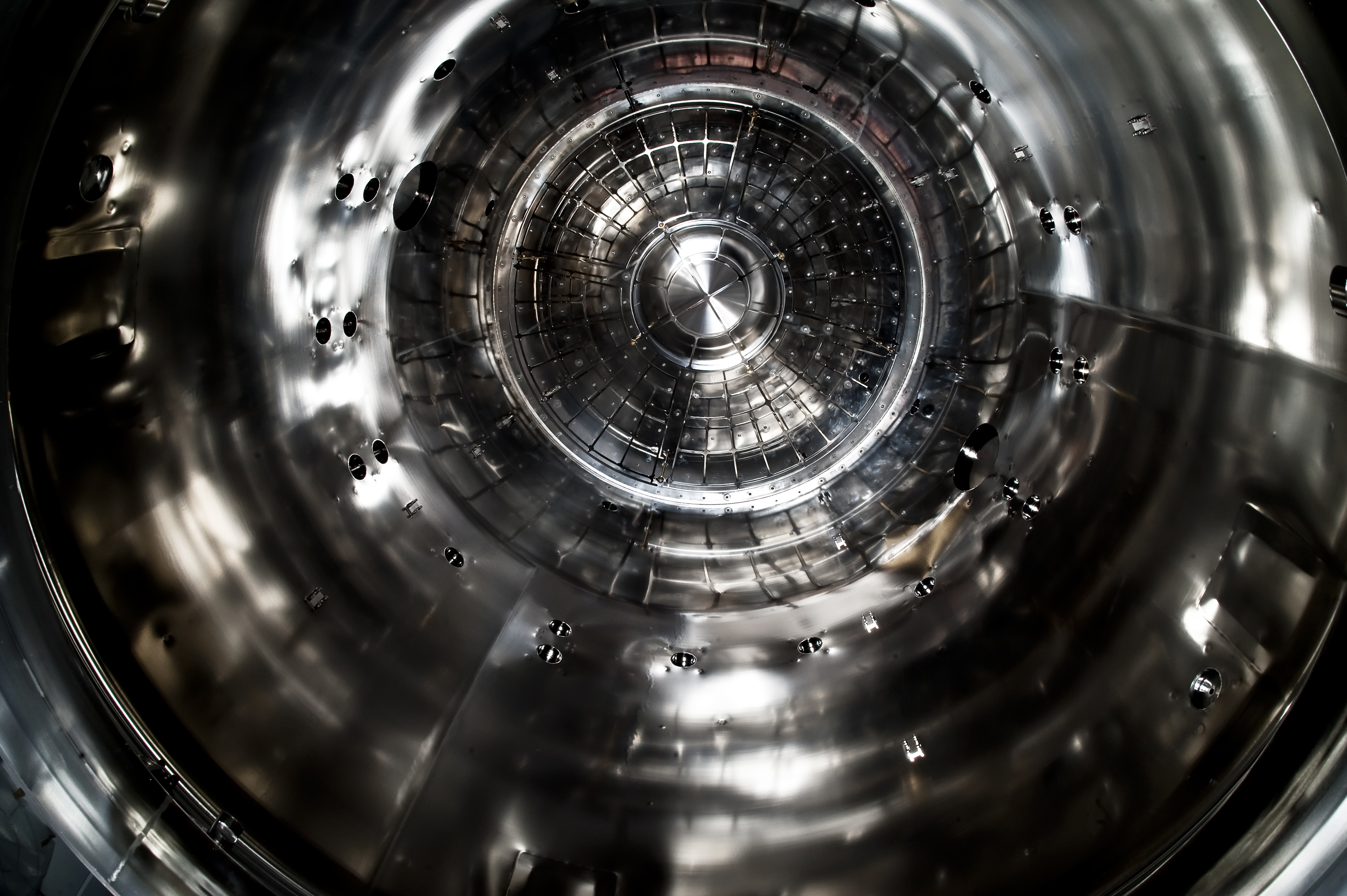
View inside the chamber of the CLOUD experiment

The core of the experiment is a stainless steel chamber of 26 m^{3} volume filled with synthetic air made from liquid nitrogen and liquid oxygen. The chamber atmosphere and pressure is being measured and regulated by various instrumentations. The aerosol chamber can be exposed to an adjustable particle beam simulating GCRs at various altitude or latitude. UV illumination allows photolytic reaction. The chamber contains an electric field cage to control the drift of small ions and charged aerosols. The ionisation produced by cosmic rays can be removed with a strong electric field. Besides, humidity and temperature inside the chamber can be regulated, allowing for fast adiabatic expansion for artificial clouds (compare cloud chamber) or experiments on ice microphysics. According to Kirkby "the level of cleanliness and control in a laboratory experiment is at the limit of current technology, and CERN know-how has been crucial for CLOUD being the first experiment to achieve this performance."

== Results ==
CERN posted a 2009 progress report on the CLOUD project. J. Kirkby (2009) reviews developments in the CERN CLOUD project and planned tests. He describes cloud nucleation mechanisms which appear energetically favourable and depend on GCRs.

On 24 August 2011, preliminary research published in the journal Nature showed there was a connection between Cosmic Rays and aerosol nucleation. Kirkby went on to say in the definitive CERN press Release "Ion-enhancement is particularly pronounced in the cool temperatures of the mid-troposphere and above, where CLOUD has found that sulphuric acid and water vapour can nucleate without the need for additional vapours.

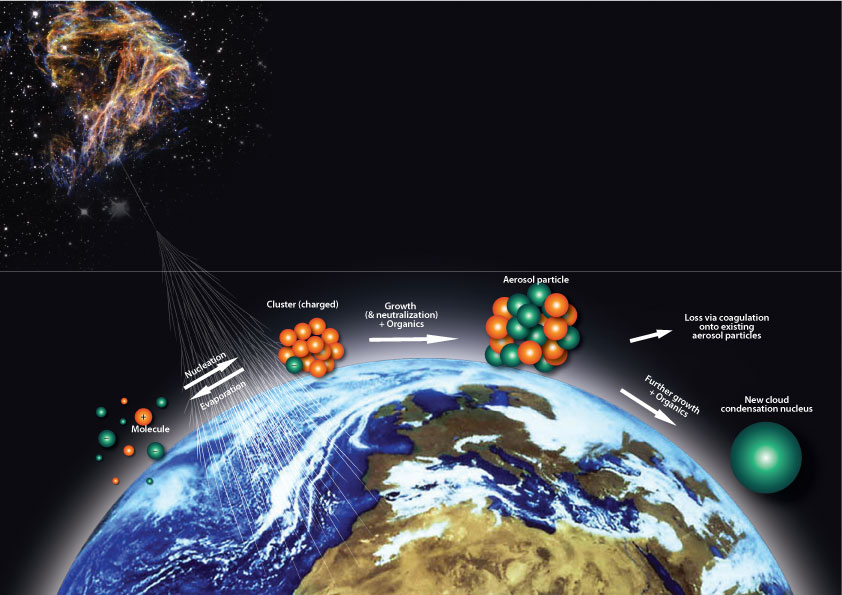
Process producing new aerosol particles

The first CLOUD experiments showed that sulphuric acid (derived from sulphur dioxide, for which fossil fuels are the predominant source) as such has a much smaller effect than had been assumed. In 2014, CLOUD researchers presented newer experimental results showing an interaction between oxidised biogenic vapours (e.g., alpha-pinene emitted by trees) and sulphuric acid. Ions produced in the atmosphere by galactic cosmic rays enhance the formation rate of these particles significantly, provided the concentrations of sulphuric acid and oxidised organic vapours are quite low. This new process may account for seasonal variations in atmospheric aerosol particles, which are being related to higher global tree emissions in the northern hemisphere summer.

Besides biogenic vapours produced by plants, another class of trace vapours, amines have been shown by CLOUD to cluster with sulphuric acid to produce new aerosol particles in the atmosphere. These are found close to their primary sources, e.g. animal husbandry, while alpha-pinene is generally found over landmasses. The experiments show that sulfuric acid and oxidized organic vapors at low concentrations reproduce suitable particle nucleation rates. The nucleation mechanism used on global aerosol models yields a photochemically and biologically driven seasonal cycle of particle concentrations and cloud formation in good agreement with observations. CLOUD insofar allows to explain a large fraction of cloud seeds in the lower atmosphere involving sulphuric acid and biogenic aerosols. CLOUD researchers note that cosmic rays have little influence on the formation of sulphuric acid–amine particle formation: "The ion-induced contribution is generally small, reflecting the high stability of sulphuric acid–dimethylamine clusters and indicating that galactic cosmic rays exert only a small influence on their formation, except at low overall formation rates." This result does not support the hypothesis that cosmic rays significantly affect climate, although a CERN press release states that neither does it "rule out a role for cosmic radiation" in climate.

Dunne et al. (2016) have presented the main outcomes of 10 years of results obtained at the CLOUD experiment performed at CERN. They have studied in detail the physico-chemical mechanisms and the kinetics of aerosols formation. The nucleation process of water droplets/ice micro-crystals from water vapor reproduced in the CLOUD experiment and also directly observed in the Earth atmosphere do not only involve ions formation due to cosmic rays but also a range of complex chemical reactions with sulfuric acid, ammonia and organic compounds emitted in the air by human activities and by organisms living on land or in the oceans (plankton). Although they observe that a fraction of cloud nuclei is effectively produced by ionisation due to the interaction of cosmic rays with the constituents of Earth atmosphere, this process is insufficient to attribute all of the present climate modifications to the fluctuations of the cosmic rays intensity modulated by changes in the solar activity and Earth magnetosphere.
