= Paul Reiter =

- Scientific career
- Fields: Entomology
- Institutions: Pasteur Institute

Paul Reiter is a professor of medical entomology at the Pasteur Institute in Paris, France. He is a member of the World Health Organization Expert Advisory Committee on Vector Biology and Control. He was an employee of the Centers for Disease Control (Dengue Branch) for 22 years. He is a specialist in the natural history, epidemiology and control of mosquito-borne diseases such as dengue fever, West Nile fever, and malaria. He is a Fellow of the Royal Entomological Society.

== Criticism of the IPCC ==
Reiter says he was a contributor to the third IPCC Working Group II (Impacts, adaptation and vulnerability) report but resigned because he "found [himself] at loggerheads with persons who insisted on making authoritative pronouncements, although they had little or no knowledge of [his] speciality". After ceasing to contribute he says he struggled to get his name removed from the Third report

"After much effort and many fruitless discussions, I decided to concentrate on the USGCCRP and resigned from the IPCC project. My resignation was accepted, but in a first draft I found that my name was still listed. I requested its removal, but was told it would remain because "I had contributed". It was only after strong insistence that I succeeded in having it removed."

Reiter is sceptical about the IPCC process, as seen in his 25 April 2006, testimony to the United States Senate:

"A galling aspect of the debate is that this spurious 'science' is endorsed in the public forum by influential panels of 'experts.' I refer particularly to the Intergovernmental Panel on Climate Change (IPCC). Every five years, this UN-based organization publishes a 'consensus of the world's top scientists' on all aspects of climate change. Quite apart from the dubious process by which these scientists are selected, such consensus is the stuff of politics, not of science. Science proceeds by observation, hypothesis and experiment. The complexity of this process, and the uncertainties involved, are a major obstacle to a meaningful understanding of scientific issues by non-scientists. In reality, a genuine concern for mankind and the environment demands the inquiry, accuracy and scepticism that are intrinsic to authentic science. A public that is unaware of this is vulnerable to abuse."

Reiter presented Malaria in the debate on climate change and mosquito-borne disease on 25 April 2006. The four primary points of his presentation here were:

1. Malaria is not an exclusively tropical disease
2. The transmission dynamics of the disease are complex; the interplay of climate, ecology, mosquito biology, mosquito behavior and many other factors defies simplistic analysis.
3. It is facile to attribute current resurgence of the disease to climate change, or to use models based on temperature to “predict” future prevalence.
4. Environmental activists use the ‘big talk’ of science to create a simple but false paradigm. Malaria specialists who protest this are generally ignored, or labelled as ‘sceptics’.

The UK government has said that Reiter "does not accurately represent the current scientific debate on the potential impacts of climate change on health in general, or malaria in particular. He appears to have been quite selective in the references and reports that he has criticised, focusing on those that are neither very recent nor reflective of the current state of knowledge, now or when they were published."

In the film, The Great Global Warming Swindle, Reiter says, "This claim that the IPCC is the world's top 1500 or 2500 scientists, you look at the bibliographies of the people and it's simply not true. There are quite a number of non-scientists."
