= Aviva Brecher =

Romanian-American applied physicist and transportation scientist

Aviva Brecher (born July 4, 1945) is a Romanian-American applied physicist and transportation scientist who studied magnetic levitation for many years at the John A. Volpe National Transportation Systems Center, a research center of the United States Department of Transportation.

== Early life and education ==
Brecher was born on July 4, 1945, to a Jewish family in Bucharest, where her father was a gynecologist. Her family moved to Israel when she was 15. While attending high school in Israel, she met and became involved with her future husband, Kenneth Brecher, a physics student at the Massachusetts Institute of Technology (MIT) who had visited Israel to work with Nathan Rosen. After graduating as valedictorian from high school in Kiryat Haim, she began her university studies in applied physics at the Technion – Israel Institute of Technology, but transferred to MIT to be closer to Brecher, whom she married in Israel before moving to the US and becoming a naturalized US citizen.

As an MIT student, she began her studies in biophysics, working with Patrick David Wall and Jerome Lettvin on research leading to the invention of transcutaneous electrical nerve stimulation, but switched to solid-state physics after being inspired by a course on the subject given by Mildred Dresselhaus, and did summer research with Benjamin Lax at the MIT Francis Bitter National Magnet Laboratory. She also became secretary of the MIT Israeli Student Association and active in the MIT branch of Hillel International. She graduated from MIT in 1968, with both bachelor's and master's degrees in physics.

Although Lax invited Brecher to remain at MIT and to continue her work with him as a doctoral student, she was advised against this course of action by Dresselhaus because the research would be classified and would channel her career into work at a federal defense laboratory. Instead, she became a doctoral student in applied physics at the University of California, San Diego, supported by an Amelia Earhart Fellowship, while her husband worked at UCSD as a postdoctoral researcher. Her official doctoral advisor was oceanographer Gustaf Arrhenius, the grandson and son-in-law of Nobel laureates Svante Arrhenius and George de Hevesy; she was also mentored at UCSD by another Nobel laureate, Hannes Alfvén. Her doctoral research included work on the formation of asteroids and meteorites, the interactions of this formation process with the magnetic field of the Solar System, and the possibility of chemical reactions in the interstellar medium. She completed her Ph.D. in 1972.

== Career and later life ==
After completing her Ph.D., Brecher returned to MIT as a postdoctoral researcher in Earth and Planetary Sciences, remaining there as a research associate from 1972 to 1977 and doing research on the properties of Moon rocks collected by the Apollo program. She became an assistant professor at Wellesley College from 1977 to 1980, while continuing to run her research program and occasionally lecture at MIT.

Unable to be considered for tenure at Wellesley, Brecher dropped out of academia in 1980 to become a risk assessment expert for the Arthur D. Little company, on projects including nuclear waste management, mining, and space exploration. In 1983 and 1984 she worked as a Congressional Science Fellow for senator Paul Tsongas, where her work included opposition to anti-satellite weapons and to the Strategic Defense Initiative. After this, she remained at Arthur D. Little for another year until, in 1985, becoming Director of Academic Corporate Relation at Boston University.

In 1986, Brecher became a researcher at the John A. Volpe National Transportation Systems Center, where her work included studies of magnetic levitation, unmanned aerial vehicles, planning for potential transportation-related bioterrorism attacks, remote sensing, radiation exposure, prevention of drug trafficking, and air traffic control. She retired in 2015.

== Recognition ==
In 1999, Brecher was elected as a Fellow of the American Physical Society (APS), after a nomination from the APS Forum on Physics and Society, "for her many contributions to society in the areas of transportation research, environmental mitigation and strategic arms control". She was a Sigma Xi Distinguished Lecturer for 2002–2003.

Asteroid 4242 Brecher, discovered in 1981, was named in honor of Brecher and her husband.
