= Fritz Vahrenholt =

German politician and climate change denier (born 1949)

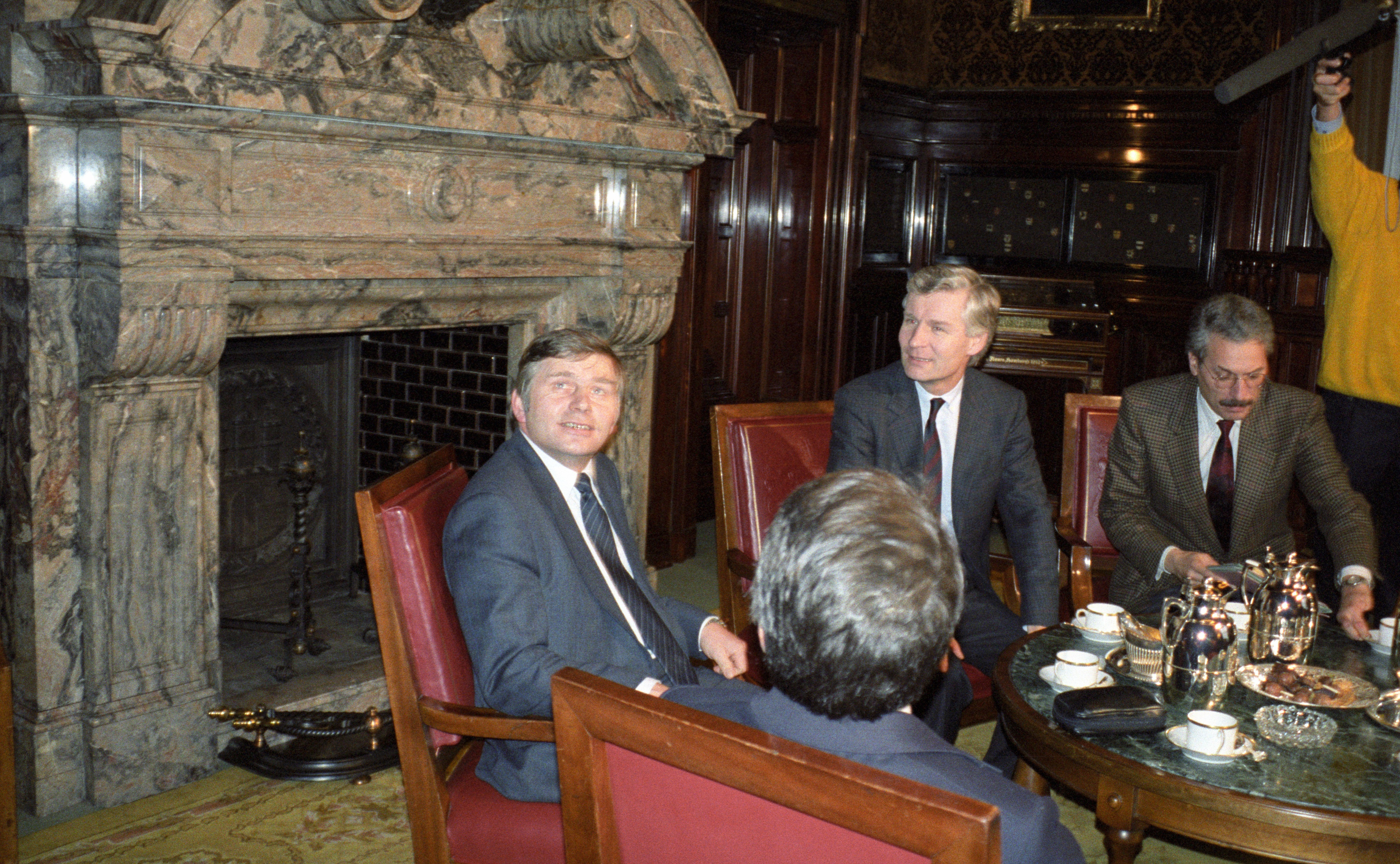
Fritz Vahrenholt (right), Henning Voscherau (middle) and Alfred Gomolka (1990)

Fritz Vahrenholt (born 8 May 1949) is a German politician (SPD), industrialist, and climate change denier.

== Biography ==
Vahrenholt was born in Gelsenkirchen-Buer. He studied chemistry in Münster and started his professional career at the federal Umweltbundesamt (environmental protection agency) in Berlin and the Ministry for Environment of Hesse. From 1984 till 1990 he was in a leading role in Hamburg, first as a Staatsrat (Councilor) for the Hamburg Department of the Environment. From 1990 to 1991 he led the Senatskanzlei (Hamburg Senate Chancellery). Then he was Umweltsenator (senator for the environment) in Hamburg from 1991 to 1997.

In 1998 he entered the energy industry and until 2001 was on the Board of Deutsche Shell AG, a Shell subsidiary. In 2001 he moved to post of CEO of the wind turbine company REpower Systems AG and remained there until 2007. From February 2008 to June 2012 he was CEO of electric power company RWE subsidiary RWE Innogy and remains on the supervisory board. Vahrenholt has a doctorate in chemistry. In 1999 he was made an Honorary Professor of chemistry at the University of Hamburg.

2012 Vahrenholt was elected chair of Deutsche Wildtier Stiftung, a German foundation for the preservation of wildlife in Germany. In 2019, he was ejected with immediate effect from this function.

Vahrenholt is chairman of the supervisory board of the largest European copper company Aurubis.

== Global warming denial ==
Vahrenholt belongs to the minority that is dismissive about human-induced global warming. In 2012 Vahrenholt together with geologist Sebastian Lüning published Die kalte Sonne: warum die Klimakatastrophe nicht stattfindet (The Cold Sun: Why the Climate Crisis Isn't Happening), a book asserting that climate change is driven by variations in solar activity. They predict the Earth is entering a cooling phase due to periodic solar cycles, and will cool by 0.2 to 0.3 degrees C by 2035. Other contributors are Nir Shaviv, Werner Weber, Henrik Svensmark and Nicola Scafetta. Numerous scientists, including the Council for Sustainable Development , criticised the book and considered its underlying assumptions to be either outdated or highly speculative.
