= Inter Region Economic Network =

Kenyan think tank

The Inter Region Economic Network (IREN) is a private Limited company based in Nairobi, Kenya, which advocates for free market economics for the development of Africa. Its founder and director is James Shikwati. IREN's key focus areas include targeted events, training, research, consultancy, communication and its online flagship magazine: The African Executive - published in English every Wednesday.
