= Nir Shaviv =

Israeli-American astrophysicist

- ניר שביב
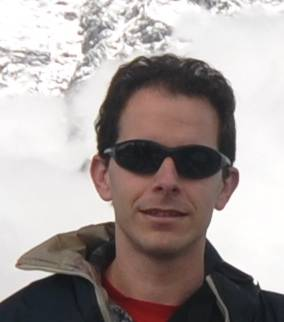
- Nir Shaviv, 2009
- Born: July 6, 1972 (age 54); Ithaca, New York
- Scientific career
- Fields: Astrophysics
- Workplaces: Hebrew University of Jerusalem

Nir Joseph Shaviv (Hebrew: ניר יוסף שביב; born July 6, 1972) is an Israeli‐American physics professor. He is professor at the Racah Institute of Physics of the Hebrew University of Jerusalem.

He is known for his solar and cosmic-ray hypothesis of climate change which disagrees with the scientific consensus on human-caused climate change. In 2002, Shaviv hypothesised that passages through the Milky Way's spiral arms appear to have been the cause behind the major ice-ages over the past billion years. In his later work, co-authored by Jan Veizer, a low upper limit was placed on the climatic effect of CO_{2}.

His best known contribution to the field of astrophysics was to demonstrate that the Eddington luminosity is not a strict limit, namely, that astrophysical objects can be brighter than the Eddington luminosity without blowing themselves apart. This is achieved through the development of a porous atmosphere that allows the radiation to escape while exerting little force on the gas. The theory was correctly used to explain the mass-loss in Eta Carinae's giant eruption, and the evolution of classical nova eruptions.

== Education and career ==
Shaviv started taking courses at the Israel Institute of Technology in Haifa at age 13. After a 3-year service in the IDF Unit 8200, he received in 1994 a Master of Science in physics and a doctorate during 1994–96. During 1996–99, he was a Lee DuBridge Prize Fellow at Caltech's TAPIR (Theoretical Astrophysics) group. During 1999–2001, he was in a postdoctorate position at the Canadian Institute for Theoretical Astrophysics. In 2001–2006, he was a senior lecturer at Racah Institute of Physics at the Hebrew University of Jerusalem. In 2006–2012, he was an associate professor, and full professor since 2012. Between 2008 and 2011, he was the head of the faculty union of the Hebrew University, and he served as the chairman of coordinating council of faculty unions between 2010 and 2014. In 2014, he became a member of the Institute for Advanced Study in Princeton, and served as the chairman of The Racah Institute of Physics between 2015 and 2019.

== Scientific research ==
=== Eddington luminosity limit ===
In 1999, Shaviv has shown that inhomogeneities in stellar atmospheres reduce the effective opacity and thus increase the Eddington luminosity. Shaviv later showed that atmospheres are inherently unstable as the Eddington luminosity is approached, that these atmospheres will develop continuum driven winds that explain the appearance of eta-Carinae and classical nova eruptions.

In 2010, Shaviv made the prediction that Type IIn supernova should have super-Eddington outbursts before the main supernova explosions since the super-Eddington states can naturally explain the circum-stellar material present around the supernova at the time of explosion (Giving the narrow lines observed in the spectrum, i.e., the "n" in the Type IIn). Such precursors were later detected with the Palomar Transient Factory, making them the first systematically detected supernova precursors.

=== Cosmic rays and climate ===
Shaviv has been one of the proponents of a cosmic ray climate link. In 2003 he has shown that the cosmic ray flux over the past billion years can be reconstructed from the exposure ages of Iron meteorites, that these flux variations are expected from spiral arm passages, and they correlate with the appearance of ice age epochs on Earth. In a later work with Ján Veizer, it was demonstrated that the temperature reconstruction over the Phanerozoic correlates with the cosmic ray flux, but it does not correlate with the CO_{2} reconstruction, thus placing an upper limit on the effects of CO_{2}. This prompted several reactions by the climate community and rebuttals by Shaviv and his colleagues.

He has also shown that the cosmic ray climate link explains part the faint young Sun paradox, since the slowly decreasing solar wind will give rise to a cooling effect that compensates the solar irradiance increase. Moreover, long term star formation activity in the Milky Way correlate with long term climate variations.

In a more recent work with Andreas Prokoph and Ján Veizer, it was argued that the reconstructed temperature has a clear 32 million year oscillation that is consistent with the Solar System's motion perpendicular to the galactic plane. The oscillation also appears to have a secondary modulation consistent with the radial epicyclic motion of the Solar System.

=== Solar variation and climate sensitivity ===
Because the existence of a significant cosmic ray climate link implies that solar variability will also have a large effect on the climate, Shaviv advocated the idea that natural climate variations play a significant role in 20th century climate change. Moreover, if solar activity increase over the 20th century contributed to warming in addition to the anthropogenic forcing, then the overall climate sensitivity should be lower than advocated by standard scenarios which do not include solar forcing.

In 2008, Shaviv used the oceans as a giant calorimeter to quantify the solar radiative forcing. He found that the peak to peak variations are close to 1 W/m^{2}, significantly more than can be expected from the changes in the solar irradiance. In 2011, he published a paper with Shlomi Ziskin arguing that the solar variability explains about half the 20th century warming, with the other half attributable to anthropogenic forcing.

Shaviv's solar hypothesis has been disputed by Mike Lockwood and Claus Froehlich (1936–2019) in an analysis of the Sun's output over the last 25 years. They argue that the Sun's activity has been decreasing since 1985 while global temperatures have continued to rise. Shaviv argues that Lockwood and Froehlich's analysis is flawed for a number of reasons. Firstly, while sunspot activity declined after 1985, cosmic ray flux reached a minimum in 1992 and contributed to warming during the 1990s. Secondly, Shaviv argues that short term variations in radiative forcing are damped by the oceans, leading to a lag between changes in solar output and the effect on global temperatures. While the 2001 maximum was weaker than the 1990 maximum, increasing solar activity during previous decades was still having a warming effect, not unlike the lag between noon and the hottest hour of the day. Later quantitative modeling showed that indeed there is no discrepancy. The perceived "hiatus" in the early 2000s is a natural consequence of the decreased solar activity.

== Rejection of human-caused climate change ==
Shaviv disagrees with the scientific consensus on human-caused climate change. He claims that solar activity changes have contributed between half to two thirds of the warming over the 20th century, and that climate sensitivity should be on the low side ΔT_{x2}=1.3±0.4 °C compared with IPCC's range of ΔT_{x2}=1.5 to 4.5 °C per CO_{2} doubling.

Shaviv was interviewed for The Great Global Warming Swindle documentary. In the film he states:

A few years ago if you would ask me I would tell you it's CO_{2}. Why? Because just like everyone else in the public I listened to what the media had to say.

In 2012, he contributed, along with Werner Weber, Henrik Svensmark and Nicola Scafetta, to the book Die kalte Sonne. Warum die Klimakatastrophe nicht stattfindet (The Cold Sun) of Fritz Vahrenholt and Sebastian Lüning, a book expressing climate change denial, which attracted considerable interest in Germany. Numerous scientists criticised the book and considered its underlying assumptions to be either outdated or highly speculative.

In 2018, the German Bundestag's environment committee invited him as an expert to the German Parliament. There he denied that carbon dioxide had a substantial effect on climate change and claimed the Intergovernmental Panel on Climate Change (IPCC) was ignoring information that the sun was the primary cause for climate change.

Nir Shaviv has been a speaker for the Heartland Institute.

== Prizes and awards ==
- 1996 Wolf foundation award for excellence as PhD student
- 1996 Lee A. DuBridge scholarship at Caltech
- 2000 Beatrice Tremaine scholarship in Toronto
- 2004 Siegfried Samuel Wolf lecture for nuclear physics
- 2014 IBM Einstein Fellowship, Institute for Advanced Study, Princeton

== Selected papers ==
- Elphick, C; Regev, O. & Shaviv, Nir J (1992), "Dynamics of Fronts in Thermally Bistable Fluids", The Astrophysical Journal, 392 (1): 106, Bibcode:1992ApJ...392..106E, doi:10.1086/171410
- Shaviv, Nir J (1998), "Can Nonlinear Structure Form at the Era of Decoupling?", Mon. Not. R. Astron. Soc., 297 (4): 1245–1260, arXiv:astro-ph/9804292, Bibcode:1998MNRAS.297.1245S, doi:10.1046/j.1365-8711.1998.01602.x, S2CID 126440
- Dar, A; Laor, A. & Shaviv, Nir J (1998), "Life extinctions by cosmic ray jets", Physical Review Letters, 80 (26): 5813–5816, arXiv:astro-ph/9705008, Bibcode:1998PhRvL..80.5813D, doi:10.1103/PhysRevLett.80.5813, S2CID 14143132
- Shaviv, Nir J (2000), "The Porous Atmosphere of eta-Carinae", The Astrophysical Journal Letters, 532 (2): L137–L140, arXiv:astro-ph/0002212, Bibcode:2000ApJ...532L.137S, doi:10.1086/312585, PMID 10715243, S2CID 705762
- ———————— (2003), "The Spiral Structure of the Milky Way, Cosmic-Rays and Ice-Age Epochs on Earth", New Astronomy, 8 (1): 39–77, arXiv:astro-ph/0209252, Bibcode:2003NewA....8...39S, doi:10.1016/S1384-1076(02)00193-8, S2CID 879406
- ————————; Veizer, Ján (2003), "Celestial driver of Phanerozoic climate?", GSA Today, 13 (7): 4–10, Bibcode:2003GSAT...13g...4S, doi:10.1130/1052-5173(2003)013<0004:CDOPC>2.0.CO;2
- ———————— (2005), "On Climate Response to Changes in the Cosmic Ray Flux and Radiative Budget", J. Geophys. Res. Space Phys., 110 (A8) 2004JA010866: A08105, arXiv:physics/0409123, Bibcode:2005JGRA..110.8105S, doi:10.1029/2004JA010866, S2CID 16364672
- Scherer, K; Fichtner, H; Borrmann, T; Beer, J; Desorgher, L; Flükiger, E; Fahr, H; Ferreira, SE; et al. (2006), "Interstellar-Terrestrial Relations: Variable Cosmic Environments, The Dynamic Heliosphere, and Their Imprints on Terrestrial Archives and Climate", Space Science Reviews, 127 (1–4): 327, Bibcode:2006SSRv..127..327S, doi:10.1007/s11214-006-9126-6, S2CID 119640116

== Lectures (selection) ==
- Shaviv, Nir J (August 2003), "Climate Change and the Cosmic Ray Connection", International Seminar on Nuclear War and Planetary Emergencies – 30th session, Erice, Italy: Ed. R. Ragaini, World Scientific (invited)
