= Einstein's Universe =

1979 BBC documentary film

- Screenplay by: Nigel Calder
- Produced by: Martin Freeth
- Production company: BBC TV
- Release date: 1979
- Running time: 117 minutes
- Country: United Kingdom
- Language: English

Einstein's Universe is a 1979 British science documentary film. It was written by Nigel Calder and produced by BBC TV in association with WGBH, Boston to mark the occasion of the 100th birthday of Albert Einstein (March 14, 1879). On 1 January 1980 it was broadcast on ARD in German dubbing.

== Cast ==
- Peter Ustinov as narrator

Interviewees

- Kenneth Brecher
- Sidney Drell
- Roger Penrose
- Wallace Sargent
- Dennis Sciama
- Irwin Shapiro
- John Archibald Wheeler

== Production ==
The main filming location was the McDonald Observatory in Texas, USA.

== Reception ==
John O'Connor wrote in The New York Times: "Einstein's Universe focuses on the scientist's work and ideas, from his theories of relativity to his time‐space and energy-matter investigations. With Peter Ustinov as host and narrator, an attempt is made to avoid the generally unimaginative ways science is taught in school. Based in a Texas observatory, Mr. Ustinov talks with various scientists. He uses special props and laboratory instruments to illustrate difficult concepts. He even assumes different roles, at one point becoming his own twin brother who travels in space toward a 'black hole.' Mr. Ustinov also reads from Einstein's writings, using a thick German accent that sometimes triggers disconcerting memories of old Sid Caesar routines. ... Although Einstein is being popularized, he is not being made simple. The viewer with no academic preparation will remain completely befuddled. And those whose resistance to scientific subjects is chronic may find their comprehension as warped as the space that surrounds the earth."

The Hollywood Reporter wrote: "Einstein's Universe was pegged to coincide with the 100th anniversary of the birth of Albert Einstein, the scientist whose theory of relativity turned the scientific world upside down with its astounding vision. As such, the show sought to give an idea of just how far advanced Einstein's mind was in relation to man's place in the solar system. That it failed to accomplish this aim was mostly due to the preponderance of mathematical and astronomical equations, coupled with complicated jargon that resisted the stated attempts for simplicity, winding up beyond most viewers (this one included). A biographical approach might have served the program, and the subject saluted, infinitely better. Where the film excelled (and, at two hours, it could've jettisoned half that length to greater benefit) was in its animated sequences, which almost single-handedly made up for the special's verbal density."

The Boston Phoenix wrote: "The program's intention is to elucidate the great man's discoveries and to show us how they've changed our view of the cosmos. Yet the execution falls lamentably short. ... Unfortunately, the material is presented neither chronologically – one discovery or theory following logically from those that came before – nor in a step-by-step manner from the simple to the complex. Instead, there are unconnected episodes that leave the layman despairing of ever grasping the whole picture. ... Einstein's Universe never goes into orbit. Perhaps modern physics is simply too abstract to explain. On the other hand, it may be that television is still in its own Dark Ages."

== Book ==
A tie-in book of the same title, written by Calder, was published on the film's release.
