= The African Executive =

Kenyan business magazine

The African Executive is a weekly opinion and business magazine published by the Inter Region Economic Network (IREN), located in Nairobi, Kenya. The magazine attracts international opinion writers to comment on Africa's socio-political and economic development.

== History ==
The magazine was established in 2005 and traces its roots to James Shikwati's weekly opinion pieces that were circulated to subscribed list of members in 2001 - 2002. The weekly circulation of this opinion pieces was changed to an IREN Kenya Newsletter (2002 - 2005) which later transformed into The African Executive Magazine that accommodates wider opinion and reviews on issues about Africa.
