= Henrik Svensmark =

Danish physicist and professor

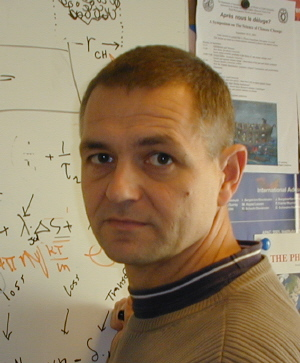
- Svensmark in 2001
- Born: 1958 (age 67–68)
- Education: Technical University of Denmark
- Awards: Energy-E2 Research Prize; Knud Hojgaard Anniversary Research Prize
- Scientific career
- Fields: Physicist
- Workplaces: Danish Space Research Institute (DSRI) at Danish National Space Center at Technical University of Denmark

Henrik Svensmark (born 1958) is a Danish physicist and professor in the Division of Solar System Physics at the Danish National Space Institute (DTU Space) in Copenhagen. He is known for his work on the hypothesis that fewer cosmic rays are an indirect cause of global warming via cloud formation.

== Early life and education ==
Henrik Svensmark obtained a Master of Science in Engineering (Cand. Polyt) in 1985 and a Ph.D. in 1987 from the Physics Laboratory I at the Technical University of Denmark.

== Career ==
Correlation between variations in cosmic ray flux (red) and change in sea temperature (black).

Henrik Svensmark was director of the Center for Sun-Climate Research at the Danish Space Research Institute (DSRI), a part of the Danish National Space Center. He previously headed the sun-climate group at DSRI. He held postdoctoral positions in physics at three other organizations: University of California, Berkeley, Nordic Institute for Theoretical Physics, and the Niels Bohr Institute.

In 1997, Svensmark and Eigil Friis-Christensen popularised a theory that linked galactic cosmic rays and global climate change mediated primarily by variations in the intensity of the solar wind, which they have termed cosmoclimatology. This theory had earlier been reviewed by Dickinson. One of the small-scale processes related to this link was studied in a laboratory experiment performed at the Danish National Space Center (paper published in the Proceedings of the Royal Society A, February 8, 2007).

Svensmark's conclusions from his research downplay the significance of the effects of man-made increases in atmospheric CO_{2} on recent and historical global warming, with him arguing that while the climate change role of greenhouse gases is considerable, solar variations play a larger role.

== Cosmoclimatology theory of climate change ==
Svensmark detailed his theory of cosmoclimatology in a paper published in 2007. The Center for Sun-Climate Research at the Danish National Space Institute "investigates the connection between solar activity and climatic changes on Earth". Its homepage lists several publications earlier works related to cosmoclimatology.

Svensmark and Nigel Calder published a book The Chilling Stars: A New Theory of Climate Change (2007) describing the Cosmoclimatology theory that cosmic rays "have more effect on the climate than manmade CO_{2}":

"During the last 100 years cosmic rays became scarcer because unusually vigorous action by the Sun batted away many of them. Fewer cosmic rays meant fewer clouds—and a warmer world."

Scientists have generally not found the published work of Svensmark et al. persuasive. For example, Lockwood et al. find that "The cloud-cosmic ray suggestion increasingly fails to match observations". A joint Spanish/Japanese collaboration of solar ray/astrophysics experts found that the change in global cloud cover is closely correlated with El Niño–Southern Oscillation and uncorrelated with solar rays.

Other scientists have vigorously criticized Svensmark for sloppy and inconsistent work: one example is adjustment of cloud data that understates error in lower cloud data, but not in high cloud data; another example is "incorrect handling of the physical data" resulting in graphs that do not show the correlations they claim to show. Despite Svensmark's assertions, galactic cosmic rays have shown no statistically significant influence on changes in cloud cover, and have been demonstrated in studies to have no causal relationship to changes in global temperature.

A documentary film on Svensmark's theory, The Cloud Mystery, was produced by Lars Oxfeldt Mortensen and premiered in January 2008 on Danish TV 2.

In April 2012, Svensmark published an expansion of his theory in the Monthly Notices of the Royal Astronomical Society

In the new work he claims that the diversity of life on Earth over the last 500 million years might be explained by tectonics affecting the sea-level together with variations in the local supernova rate, and virtually nothing else. This suggests that the progress of evolution is affected by climate variation depending on the galactic cosmic ray flux.

The director of DTU Space, Prof. Eigil Friis-Christensen, commented: "When this enquiry into effects of cosmic rays from supernova remnants began 16 years ago, we never imagined that it would lead us so deep into time, or into so many aspects of the Earth's history. The connection to evolution is a culmination of this work."

== Hypothesis tests ==
Preliminary experimental tests have been conducted in the SKY Experiment at the Danish National Space Science Center. CERN, the European Organization for Nuclear Research in Geneva, is preparing comprehensive verification in the CLOUD Project.

=== SKY Experiment ===
Svensmark conducted proof of concept experiments in the SKY Experiment at the Danish National Space Institute.

To investigate the role of cosmic rays in cloud formation low in the Earth's atmosphere, the SKY experiment used natural muons (heavy electrons) that can penetrate even to the basement of the National Space Institute in Copenhagen. The hypothesis, verified by the experiment, is that electrons released in the air by the passing muons promote the formation of molecular clusters that are building blocks for cloud condensation nuclei.

Critics of the hypothesis claimed that particle clusters produced measured just a few nanometres across, whereas aerosols typically need to have a diameter of at least 50 nm in order to serve as so-called cloud condensation nuclei. Further experiments by Svensmark and collaborators published in 2013 showed that aerosols with diameter larger than 50 nm are produced by ultraviolet light (from trace amounts of ozone, sulfur dioxide, and water vapor), large enough to serve as cloud condensation nuclei.

=== CLOUD Project Experiments ===
Scientists are preparing detailed atmospheric physics experiments to test Svensmark's thesis, building on the Danish findings. CERN started a multi-phase project in 2006, including rerunning the Danish experiment. CERN plans to use an accelerator rather than rely on natural cosmic rays. CERN's multinational project will give scientists a permanent facility where they can study the effects of both cosmic rays and charged particles in the Earth's atmosphere. CERN's project is named CLOUD (Cosmics Leaving OUtdoor Droplets).

Dunne et al. (2016) have presented the main outcomes of 10 years of results obtained at the CLOUD experiment performed at CERN. They have studied in detail the physico-chemical mechanisms and the kinetics of aerosols formation. The nucleation process of water droplets/ice micro-crystals from water vapor reproduced in the CLOUD experiment and also directly observed in the Earth atmosphere do not only involve ions formation due to cosmic rays but also a range of complex chemical reactions with sulfuric acid, ammonia and organic compounds emitted in the air by human activities and by organisms living on land or in the oceans (plankton). Although they observe that a fraction of cloud nuclei is effectively produced by ionisation due to the interaction of cosmic rays with the constituents of Earth atmosphere, this process is insufficient to attribute the present climate modifications to the fluctuations of the cosmic rays intensity modulated by changes in the solar activity and Earth magnetosphere.

== Debate and controversy ==
=== Galactic Cosmic Rays vs Global Temperature ===
Oceanographer Paul Farrar (2000) argued that, based on the spatial distribution of the cloud variation during Svensmark's study period, the variation was due to an El Niño which was synchronized with the cosmic ray signal used by Svensmark during the data period of his study. A (2003) critique by physicist Peter Laut of Svensmark's theory reanalyzed Svensmark's data and suggested that it does not support a correlation between cosmic rays and global temperature changes; it also disputes some of the theoretical bases for the theory. Svensmark replied to the paper, stating that "...nowhere in Peter Laut's (PL) paper has he been able to explain, where physical data have been handled incorrectly, how the character of my papers are misleading, or where my work does not live up to scientific standards"

Mike Lockwood of the UK's Rutherford Appleton Laboratory and Claus Froehlich of the World Radiation Center in Switzerland published a paper in 2007 which concluded that the increase in mean global temperature observed since 1985 correlates so poorly with solar variability that no type of causal mechanism may be ascribed to it, although they accept that there is "considerable evidence" for solar influence on Earth's pre-industrial climate and to some degree also for climate changes in the first half of the 20th century.

Svensmark's coauthor Calder responded to the study in an interview with LondonBookReview.com, where he put forth the counterclaim that global temperature has not risen since 1999.

Later in 2007, Svensmark and Friis-Christensen brought out a Reply to Lockwood and Fröhlich which concludes that surface air temperature records used by Lockwood and Fröhlich apparently are a poor guide to Sun-driven physical processes, but tropospheric air temperature records do show an impressive negative correlation between cosmic-ray flux and air temperatures up to 2006 if a warming trend, oceanic oscillations and volcanism are removed from the temperature data. They also point out that Lockwood and Fröhlich present their data by using running means of around 10 years, which creates the illusion of a continued temperature rise, whereas all unsmoothed data point to a flattening of the temperature, coincident with the present maxing out of the magnetic activity of the Sun, and which the continued rapid increase in CO_{2} concentrations seemingly has been unable to overrule.

=== Galactic Cosmic Rays vs Cloud Cover ===
In April 2008, Professor Terry Sloan of Lancaster University published a paper in the journal Environmental Research Letters titled "Testing the proposed causal link between cosmic rays and cloud cover", which found no significant link between cloud cover and cosmic ray intensity in the last 20 years. Svensmark responded by saying "Terry Sloan has simply failed to understand how cosmic rays work on clouds". Dr. Giles Harrison of Reading University, describes the work as important "as it provides an upper limit on the cosmic ray-cloud effect in global satellite cloud data". Harrison studied the effect of cosmic rays in the UK. He states: "Although the statistically significant non-linear cosmic ray effect is small, it will have a considerably larger aggregate effect on longer timescale (e.g. century) climate variations when day-to-day variability averages out". Brian H. Brown (2008) of Sheffield University further found a statistically significant (p<0.05) short term 3% association between Galactic Cosmic Rays (GCR) and low level clouds over 22 years with a 15-hour delay. Long-term changes in cloud cover (> 3 months) and GCR gave correlations of p=0.06.

=== Debate updates ===
More recently, Laken et al. (2012) found that new high quality satellite data show that the El Niño Southern Oscillation is responsible for most changes in cloud cover at the global and regional levels. They also found that galactic cosmic rays, and total solar irradiance did not have any statistically significant influence on changes in cloud cover.

Lockwood (2012) conducted a thorough review of the scientific literature on the "solar influence" on climate. It was found that when this influence is included appropriately into climate models causal climate change claims such as those made by Svensmark are shown to have been exaggerated. Lockwood's review also highlighted the strength of evidence in favor of the solar influence on regional climates.

Sloan and Wolfendale (2013) demonstrated that while temperature models showed a small correlation every 22 years, less than 14 percent of global warming since the 1950s could be attributed to cosmic ray rate. The study concluded that the cosmic ray rate did not match the changes in temperature, indicating that it was not a causal relationship. Another 2013 study found, contrary to Svensmark's claims, "no statistically significant correlations between cosmic rays and global albedo or globally averaged cloud height."

In 2013, a laboratory study by Svensmark, Pepke and Pedersen published in Physics Letters A showed that there is in fact a correlation between cosmic rays and the formation of aerosols of the type that seed clouds. Extrapolating from the laboratory to the actual atmosphere, the authors asserted that solar activity is responsible for approximately 50 percent of temperature variation.

In a detailed 2007 post on the scientists' blog RealClimate, Rasmus E. Benestad presented arguments for considering Svensmark's claims to be "wildly exaggerated". (Time magazine has characterized the main purpose of this blog as a "straightforward presentation of the physical evidence for global warming".)

== Selected publications ==
- Henrik Svensmark (1998). "Influence of Cosmic Rays on Earth's Climate". Physical Review Letters. 81 (22): 5027–5030. Bibcode:1998PhRvL..81.5027S. CiteSeerX 10.1.1.522.585. doi:10.1103/PhysRevLett.81.5027.
- Henrik Svensmark; Jens Olaf P. Pedersen; Nigel D. Marsh; Martin B. Enghoff; Ulrik I. Uggerhøj (2007). "Experimental evidence for the role of ions in particle nucleation under atmospheric conditions" (PDF). Proceedings of the Royal Society A: Mathematical, Physical and Engineering Sciences. 463 (2078): 385–396. Bibcode:2007RSPSA.463..385S. doi:10.1098/rspa.2006.1773. S2CID 59022072.
- Henrik Svensmark (2007). "Astronomy & Geophysics Cosmoclimatology: a new theory emerges". Astronomy & Geophysics. 48 (1): 1.18 – 1.24. Bibcode:2007A&G....48a..18S. doi:10.1111/j.1468-4004.2007.48118.x.
- Henrik Svensmark; Torsten Bondo; Jacob Svensmark (2009). "Cosmic Ray Decreases Affect Atmospheric Aerosols and Clouds" (PDF). Geophysical Research Letters. 36 (15): L15101. Bibcode:2009GeoRL..3615101S. CiteSeerX 10.1.1.394.9780. doi:10.1029/2009GL038429. S2CID 15963013. Archived from the original (PDF) on 2011-09-28.
- M.B. Enghoff; J. O. Pepke Pedersen; U. I. Uggerhøj; S. M. Paling; H. Svensmark (2011). "Aerosol nucleation induced by a high energy particle beam". Geophysical Research Letters. 38 (9): A33F–0232. Bibcode:2010AGUFM.A33F0232E. doi:10.1029/2011GL047036.

=== Books ===
- Svensmark, Henrik; Calder, Nigel (2007). The Chilling Stars: A New Theory of Climate Change. Totem Books. ISBN 978-1-84046-815-1.
- Contribution in Die kalte Sonne. Warum die Klimakatastrophe nicht stattfindet (The Cold Sun), by Fritz Vahrenholt and Sebastian Lüning (edrs)

=== Film ===
- The Cloud Mystery

== Awards ==
- 2001, the Energy-E2 Research Prize
- 1997, Knud Hojgaard Anniversary Research Prize
