= Io Isabella International Film Week =

Io, Isabella International Film Week is the first film festival in the south of Italy, and the second in Italy, devoted to women and documentary filmmaking. Its Golden Waves award is presented for best female film, best creative documentary, and best firstling (emerging talent).

The festival takes its name from Isabella Morra, a Renaissance poet of 16th-century Italy. It was first held in Isabella's home, the Castle of Valsinni, from 25 to 31 August 2005.

The festival features about 70 films, in two competitions:

- Films by and about women
- Documentary films

It also sponsors satellite programmes including a "Country in Focus", talk shows, and various events.

The 2008 the festival was held in Maratea from 29 July to 3 August; and in 2010 in Maratea from 3 to 8 August.

== See also ==
- List of women's film festivals
