= James Shikwati =

Kenyan libertarian activist

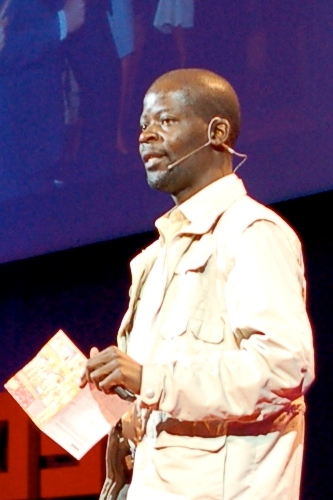
James Shikwati.

James Shikwati (born 1970) is a Kenyan libertarian economist and Director of the Inter Region Economic Network who promotes freedom of trade as the driving solution to poverty in Africa. He has made comments which imply that aid towards Africa does more harm than good to their people, based on the central arguments that it is mainly used either by politicians as a tool to manipulate people and influence votes, or as a mechanism for dumping subsidised foreign agricultural products onto local markets at below cost making it nearly impossible for African farmers to compete.

== Education ==
A graduate from the University of Nairobi (B.ED Arts 1994), attended Musingu High School (1989) and taught Kiptewit High School (1994–2001) in Kericho Rift Valley province in Kenya. He is a "self taught" economist.

== Philosophy ==
Shikwati is a writer and a commentator on public policy with a special interest in development, environment, trade and agriculture related issues. He has written widely on a variety of subjects in Kenyan and international newspapers, magazines, such as The Times, The Guardian, The Wall Street Journal, The Washington Post, The Sydney Morning Herald, The Business News, The Daily Nation, and The East African Standard.

Shikwati was also featured in a November 18, 2006 article in the New York Times:

Jeffrey D. Sachs, a Columbia University professor who is a leading aid advocate, calls Shikwati’s criticisms of foreign assistance “shockingly misguided” and “amazingly wrong.” “This happens to be a matter of life and death for millions of people, so getting it wrong has huge consequences,” Sachs said.

Shikwati has worked extensively with internationally acclaimed opinion leaders to promote ideas that improve productivity, and increase freedom to trade as a way to alleviate poverty. He facilitates several workshops every year throughout Africa geared towards promoting productivity and trade. He recently argued that development is the ability of individuals to understand the world and creatively respond to challenges that confront humanity in a manner that increases levels of human comfort on earth.

He is the founder and Executive Director of the Inter Region Economic Network [IREN], an independent and non-partisan think tank that promotes policies geared towards the creation of a free Africa. He is also the Country Director for Students In Free Enterprise [SIFE Kenya] and Chief Executive Officer (CEO) of an online business magazine The African Executive that is published weekly by IREN.

== Awards and decorations ==
On 6 July 2007, Shikwati was named among top 100 most influential Kenyans in a study that was conducted by The Standard Group, one of the Kenya’s leading media houses, he was described as one person whose decisions and actions are not motivated by the publicity they attract but by passion for what they do. On March 11, 2008, The World Economic Forum named Shikwati among the 250 Young Global Leaders of 2008.
