= Eigil Friis-Christensen =

Danish geophysicist (1944–2018)

Eigil Friis-Christensen (29 October 1944 – 21 September 2018) was a Danish geophysicist specializing in space physics.

== Career ==
Friis-Christensen received a Magisterkonferens (Ph.D. equivalent) in Geophysics from University of Copenhagen in 1971. In 1972, he was a geophysicist at the Danish Meteorological Institute. His interest in solar activity began in August, in his tent, when he experienced an extreme solar storm:

"I was in Greenland, on my first assignment in my new job as geophysicist at the Danish Meteorological Institute, setting up a chain of magnetometer stations on the west coast... watching ink pens of my recorder going so wild that they nearly tore the paper chart apart -- we had no digital recording at that time -- and I wondered whether such big events could also have an influence in the lower atmosphere, on weather and climate. That storm cut off my contact to the outside world for nine days -- all radio communication was blacked out -- so I had lots of time to reflect on the enormity of the forces at play."

Between 1976 and 1997, he was the Principal Investigator of the Greenland Magnetometer Array.

Between 1991 and 1997, he was Head of the Solar-Terrestrial Physics Division, Danish Meteorological Institute. In 1992, he was also the Project scientist on the first Danish satellite, Ørsted, which was launched February 1999.

He was an adjunct professor of geophysics and space physics 1996 to 2006 at the Niels Bohr Institute of University of Copenhagen and has authored over 140 research articles or books. He lectures worldwide; in 2008 he made a presentation at the U.S. National Institute of Aerospace.

From 2004 until 2012 Friis-Christensen was Director of the Danish National Space Center.

== Solar activity and climate change ==
Friis-Christensen's 1991 paper, "Length of the Solar Cycle: An Indicator of Solar Activity Closely Associated with Climate", published in Science, presented his findings on global warming and sun activity correlation. The New York Times reviewed the Science article on 5 November 1991, stating, "While the correlation established by Dr. Friis-Christensen and Dr. Lassen falls short of definite proof, a number of scientists nevertheless called it remarkable in its close fit between the solar and temperature trends." Subsequent work with updated data has found that the correlation has not stood up and revealed that it was due to artifacts of the methodology used by Friis-Christensen.

In 1997, Friis-Christensen and Henrik Svensmark revived suggestions of a possible link between galactic cosmic rays and global climate change assisted by solar wind intensity variation, which they termed cosmoclimatology. In 2002, he became Lead Investigator of Swarm. Friis-Christensen gave the Birkeland lecture "Unrest on the sun - storms on the Earth. The magnetic connection" in Oslo on 27 September 2007 .

In 2009, a number of leading experts, including one Nobel laureate, concluded that the graphs of Friis-Christensen and Svensmark showing apparent correlations between global warming, sunspots and cosmic rays were deeply flawed. Friis-Christensen agreed that any correlation between sunspots and global warming that he may have identified in the 1991 study has since broken down. There is, he said, a clear "divergence" between the sunspots and global temperatures after 1986, which shows that the present warming period cannot be explained by solar activity alone.

== Awards and honors ==
- 1995, "Director Ib Henriksens" research prize.
- 1995, elected member, executive committee, International Association of Geomagnetism and Aeronomy, IAGA.
- 1996, elected Associate of London's Royal Astronomical Society
- 2003, Vice-President, executive committee, IAGA
- Appointed member, International Steering Committee, Solar-Terrestrial Energy Programme, STEP and S-RAMP.
- 2008, Foreign member of the Royal Swedish Academy of Sciences
