= Digital divide in South Korea =

Differences in access to information technologies

The digital divide in South Korea refers to inequalities between individuals, households, and other groups of different demographic and socioeconomic levels in South Korea in access to information and communication technologies (ICTs) and in the knowledge and skills needed to effectively use the information gained from connecting.

The digital divide in South Korea is mainly caused by the unevenness of economic, regional, physical, or social opportunities, leading to marginalized persons not receiving the benefits that technology can bring. The lack of adaptation to the informatization of social services, such as administration and welfare, results in limited opportunities for basic daily life and social participation. South Korea's information gap was initially due to economic reasons and the difference in the initial cost for using the Internet or PC, but recently there has been a gap between the users of the information according to the degree of utilization of information. As the information society rapidly developed, the distribution of the Internet quickly accelerated in Korea, dividing people into two groups, people who are well adapted to the changes and those who are more familiar with the previous media. Although the percentage of local population with internet access is high in Korea, the average rate of internet usage is 99.9% for the young and 64.3% for the elderly.

== Drawbacks of digital divide in Korea ==
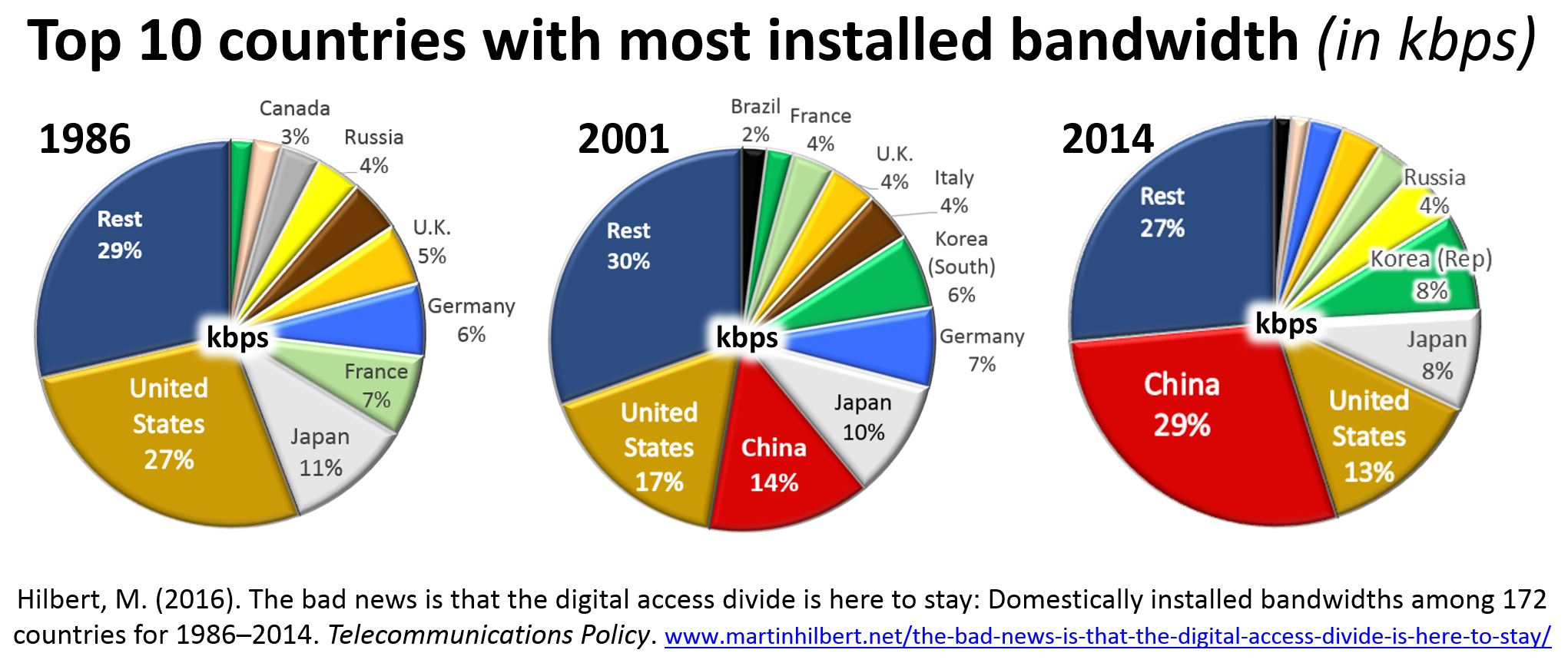
South Korea has become a more influential country with bandwidth.

However, the nature of information and knowledge, through commercialization process in capitalism, could make a greater problem than supposition. So, information and knowledge is different from previous products (shoes, clothes, food so on) in that information and knowledge's cyclic process from creating and application to extinction is most fast. Also, those alteration in quantity and quality is unpredictable. From the nature of information and knowledge, those could make enormous social inequality (ex. class, state, sex, education, region etc.). Furthermore, a global effect feature, one of the information and knowledge's nature, can deepen global inequality and further sharpen the 2080 society, called Pareto's law.

== Reasons and correlating variables ==
=== Distribution of hardware ===
The most basic reason is the distribution of hardware. The most basic hardware in the information era is a computer, which creates an information gap between those who have difficulties buying a computer and those who do not. According to the '2016 Information Gap Index and Survey' in South Korea, which conducted by the Ministry of Information and Communication (MIC) on 6,300 people nationwide, while only 53.2% of the underprivileged people have personal computer, the average proportion of whole people are nearly 83%. Computer penetration rates are affected by many correlating variables such as region, education, and income and these variables can issue a complex impact. To overcome this difference, OLPC (One Laptop per child) is developing and also distributing $100 computer. In addition, a project for the free use of the internet such as the fund router project is in progress, but it is not widely available in Korea. As 'ubiquitous' becomes more and more popular, the distribution of small hardware is expected to grow even more and the digital divide is expected to deepen further.

=== Education ===
Education is the most relevant part of income in Korea. Children of lower income earners have fewer educational opportunities than higher income earners. For this reason, the children of the low educated are more likely to be a low educated students than those of highly educated people, and this phenomenon leads to a vicious cycle of social inequality. Because the information era is built on capitalism, this vicious circle is likely to lead to current society as well. Education is an important reason of digital divide. Without education on information society, it leads to poverty of information which causes to the economic discrimination. Most of all, considering the characteristics of knowledge which is explosively expanding, if education cannot keep up with the pace of the informational change, it can cause education gap to be more severe. In order to solve this problem, continuous education is much more required rather than short term education.

=== Age ===
Age is the largest factor of digital divide in South Korea. Older people, specifically the elderly, are placed at a higher disadvantage compared to the younger generation. With the constant upgrades in technological devices, in which most of them have new features included, the elderly struggle to keep up with these new changes. Additionally, people are bound to acquire new technological skills to be able to utilize the new features of technological devices. However, the elderly fall behind on their technological skill development since they are not quick enough to learn and adapt. With these two issues, the elderly find themselves unable or less likely to enjoy communicating with others and looking up information via the technological devices.

=== Internet Use ===
There is a geographical divide in the use of Internet in South Korea. Compared to those who live in Seoul, the capital city of South Korea, those living in other cities do not rely on the Internet as much. This has to do with Seoul having a bunch of systems installed and placed all over the city that other cities do not need a lot of, such as ticketing stations, e-banking stations, electric scooter rentals, and T-money recharging stations. With all these systems implemented in Seoul, this makes Seoul much more technologically advanced compared to other cities and the country side. However, this create a divide in the ability to develop technological skills among the Korean citizens. Those who live in Seoul all their lives are able to pick up new technological skills and keep themselves updated with all the technological changes. On the contrary, for those who live in other urban cities, even though they rely on the Internet heavily, they do not pick up new technological skills as quickly as those who live in Seoul since their cities do not mass implement the systems Seoul heavily relies on. This is the same for those who live on the country side, except that Internet access is much more difficult to get compared to living in any city. Therefore, those who live on the country side tend to not pick up new technological skills quickly nor keep themselves updated with new technological devices being pushed out.

== See also ==
- Global digital divide
- Digital divide by country
- Digital Opportunity Index
- Knowledge divide
- Mercedes divide
- 초안:한국의_디지털_격차
