= Digital divide in Colombia =

Overview of the topic

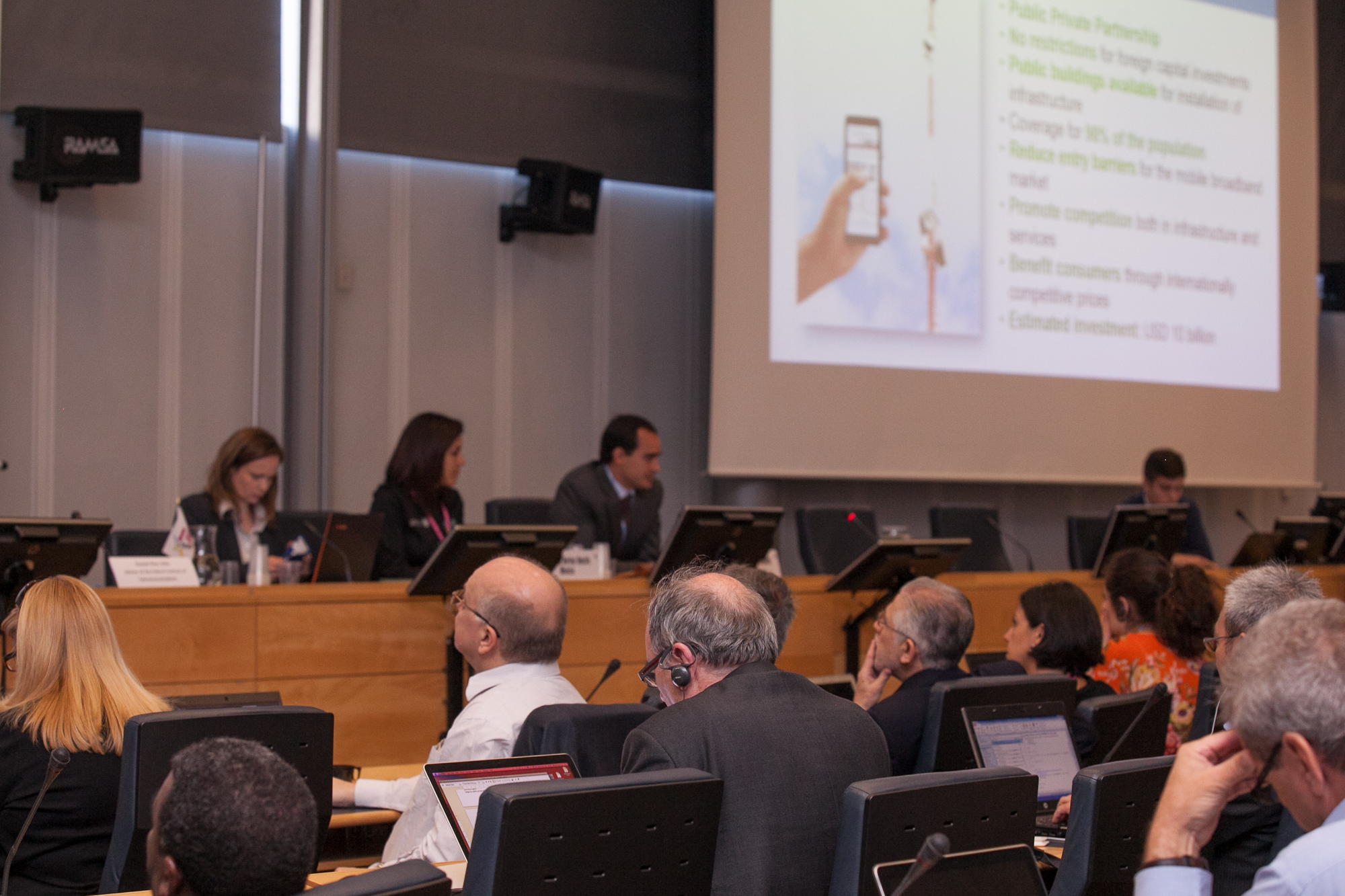

The digital divide in Colombia refers to the disparities among individuals, households, and various demographic and socioeconomic groups. More specifically, it refers to the differences in access to information and communication technologies ("ICTs") and in the knowledge and skills needed to effectively use the information gained from connecting.

The main lapse of technology and information lies in the physical access realm of things, where it is lacking tremendously. Though internet in Colombia has made progress compared to recent years, the scholarly part of how ICTs are used are still in question. With this being said, government officials have made certain that access to ICTs be a priority in their country. In addition to physical access, literature review and types of internet use have also been main points of focus in regards to a solution for digital divide in Colombia.

== Types of internet use (ICT) ==
There is a difference between material or physical access and actual use of ICTs. According to Hargittai (2008), differences in the uses of ICTs have important implications for life outcomes. Rojas and Puig-i-abril (2009) found that the most prevalent activities of Internet users in Colombia were checking e-mail, consuming entertainment content, chatting with friends, and consuming news and information. There are different levels of "use", including non-use, low use, and frequent use while also taking into consideration the opportunities taken by the users. There is a difference in those who go online just for fun and those who use the internet for the improvement of themselves.

== Physical access ==
One digital divide study displayed physical access as "having"/"not having" access to the internet. Those who are less fortunate have been shown to lack educational advantage, due to the fact of not having access to internet as common as those who are more fortunate in wealth. Communities that are more technologically advanced offers their communities to expand their knowledge and be able to communicate with other worlds. The intellectual advantage is common for countries, such as Colombia, where the poor communities are lacking the opportunities offered to those who are on the other side of town with more advantage. Poor communities are focusing on trying to make ends meet, and working hard labor without being offered to make a change to better themselves. The internet plays an important role in this, due to the fact that the internet provides opportunities to explore new jobs and to widen individuals' knowledge. In certain areas where the communities are wealthy, the internet is provided at the access of their hands. Being able to access the internet so easily, gives privileged individuals the chance to go beyond their expectations and get their point out into the world.

== Causes of the digital divide in Colombia ==
There is no singular cause of the digital divide in Colombia. A number of different factors each contribute to the variance of access to technology within Colombia. These factors include location, economic class, education, and others.

In Colombia, those located in large cities are 69% more likely to use the internet. The high correlation between the use of ICTs and location in large industrial cities is one of the most visible examples of digital divide in Colombia. People located in rural parts of Colombia are significantly less likely to use ICTs and the internet regularly for various reasons. One leading cause is simply because people living in rural parts of the country tend to be less educated which is negatively correlated with technology use. The pastoral parts of Colombia are often much less developed than the large cities. Often, these rustic areas lack the technology and internet providers needed to further bridge the digital divide between large and small cities. A study of the digital divide in Colombia concerning residency included a population in which 21.6% of respondents lived in a small or medium-sized city (<1,000,000 inhabitants), while 78.4% lived in larger urban centers. This study showed that the vast majority of ICT usage occurred in large urban areas.

=== Technology among different ideals and its effect on the economy ===
The importance of technology and its relationship with economic development was synthesized by Solow (1987a) when he stated that "technology remains the dominant engine of growth, with human capital investment in second place". Concerning economic development and moves to improve it, it is an understood phenomena that countries with the highest availability and use of technology are the countries with the best economies. Technology has not advanced in all societies as far as many thought it would be according to today's societal expectations. This lack of advancement mainly occurs in communities or organizations whose organizational context differentiates from a more skillful and high value profile to a context of autonomy. "In non-industrial contexts, non-computerized societies and organizations maintain more traditional routines, because they simultaneously face the absorption of techniques and instruments, while copying their preexisting idiosyncrasies, environments, and routines. In these cases change is perceived as expensive, time consuming and risky, producing sentiments that facilitate phobic, indifferent or stereotyped attitudes towards technology". These preconceptions towards technology play a small role in the digital divide in Colombia. Among societies who are not on the same accord in regards to technology and its benefits, attitudes towards technology show a distinct display of the amount of technological dependence a community has.

=== Cultural preservation versus cultural modernization ===
The two ideas of cultural preservation and cultural modernization create a divide amongst the world of industry and the world of agriculture. The industry field often involves research and development. Societies involving research and development often require skill in many different areas with products whose value is highly regarded. Both the qualitative and quantitative aspects of the products creates a need for enhanced work material, which often is the latest and fastest technology. Industrially, in Colombia this is understood and industries strive, strengthening the different industries and corporations all over Colombia. Colombia's somewhat partial digital divide stems from areas of Colombia where locals are resistant to change. In 2003, Avgerou found this resistance to change to be due to the uncertainties of technology among the rural population. Gille referred to what was called the Technological System. This idea of Gilles suggested that technology would eventually transform social life all together by connecting technologies and everyday productive routines. Communities often adopt things that are for the betterment of the entire community. Rural populations and communities are often close knit and every one often shares the same views. The idea of technology is not necessarily one that everyone is going to agree with, especially when a community has done without considerable updates to their prior owned technology for a long period of time. People admire their culture and want to see that it stay the same, with no flaws or inconsistencies. If the technological system adopted by the community is inconsistent or non-competitive, the host is limited by these gaps and builds and inefficient technical rationality. The combination of reverence of community and culture, and possibilities of technological gaps delays technological advancement into many developing communities and this creates a digital divide. While information technology is thriving in the developed parts of Colombia with industries and corporations using it to their economic advantage, the rural and developing side of Colombia still has some ground to cover. This delayed progress of information technology can be mended through information technology programs that teach and enable developing communities how to use technology. Progress can also be made through built trust and reassurance through the government about modernized technology.

=== Information technology in education ===
Education is oftentimes viewed as the most important aspect of a society. The relationship between quantitative and qualitative productions of learning and the effort invested in the process, measured with respect to the goals set by the educative institution, the available resources and the needs from the environment, educational productivity is defined. Though education levels tend to depend largely on strength of the governments economy, other factors, including educational programs and community involvement can have an impactful effect. The country of Colombia is primarily rural and is mainly represented by remote areas. The general population of Colombia perceives the internet as not useful and the purchasing power of Colombians is limited. This displays that access to technology is not necessarily essential and, or available. Communities from developing territories end up producing superficial changes in their tortuous transition to the new ICT paradigm, unable to keep up the pace in developing computer skills. The problem is not just the access to tools; it includes the construction of a compatible social, cultural and economic logic (Avgerou, 2003), that, due to the resistance to change from some of the local stakeholders, turns into a complex and slow process. It involves sacrificing some of the distinctive particularities of the community.

=== Solutions to digital divide in education ===
The CPE ("Computadores Para Educar", which translates to "Computers to Educate") is an organization that allows the transfer of technology to rural areas to be a much smoother one by training teachers to properly use technological information. This knowledge is taken by teachers and aimed to increase levels of incorporation, adaptation, and integration of technologies as required for achievement of sustainable growth in Colombia, ensuring increased productivity and competitiveness while consolidating the quality of the Colombian educational system. Overall, Colombia's information technology presence in public schools are relatively normal. Areas of Colombia where poor educational infrastructure is combined with an economy focused on natural resources and its exploitation, are areas with school systems that focus on technical training concerning the production of basic goods rather than long term knowledge and innovation skills. In regards to higher education and universities in Colombia information technology infrastructure is growing at an alarming rate. From possessing updated technology in the classroom to technological information possessed by those in charge, ICT's (Information Communication Technology) in the Colombian school system is currently at paramount.

== Bridging the digital divide ==
=== Government involvement ===
In 2010, President Juan Manuel Santos launched Vive Digital, a government initiative aimed to create jobs, improve economic growth and development, and—most importantly—reduce poverty. Vive Digital does this all through the embracing of financial opportunities rooted in the production and utilization of technology. Within the past four years, Vive Digital has changed the digital landscape in Colombia. The largest impact has been on the poorest citizens. Colombia has gone from 3.1 million internet broadband connections in 2010 to 9.9 million in mid-2014, and internet penetration for small and medium enterprises (SMEs) increased from 7 percent in 2010 to more than 60 percent in 2014. Another initiative the Colombian government has served the people of Colombia with is the National Broadband Policy of the Ministerio de Tecnologías de la Información y las Comunicaciones (Ministry of Information Technology and Communications) which has increased the percentage of Colombian municipalities connected to the Internet from 17 percent in 2010 to 96 percent today.

"By 2018, the government hopes to have 63 percent of the country connected to broadband. And according to 2013 GSMA mobile economy figures, there are already 43.9 million mobile connections and 24 million mobile users in a country whose 47 million people give it the third largest population in Latin America and third largest Spanish-speaking population in the world."

In May 2014, Hughes Network Systems LLC, one of the leading broadband solutions and providing services in the world, was granted a contract for an HX broadband satellite system and terminals by HISPASAT Colombia. This contract came as the result of the Vive Digital government initiative. Hughes Network's increased presence within Colombia has exponentially increased the use of information and communication technologies in Colombia.

There are two main issues with the digital divide in Colombia that is being researched on. Those two are: how the information is being delivered and, how the information that is being delivered throughout the academic community is working and communicating. The solutions to these issues is getting everyone to focus on the main idea that the way they are communicating with the community is important and vital to civilization. It is important to send out accurate information, and not inform the community with false accusations. Research has shown that the delivery of information has become a vital aspect to Colombia and it includes the way everyone lives their daily lives. Researchers are focusing on the wide spectrum of how information is being spread, whether it is via internet, digital broadcast, mobile communication, or social media networks. With all of the research, it has also been noted to inform the community with the production of interpersonal communication and improvement in technological developments. The goal of the research is to improve the digital divide for Colombia's community to provide an adequate form of communication via the participating communities.

== See also ==
- Digital divide by country
- Digital Opportunity Index
- Knowledge divide
- Mercedes divide
