= Nonprofit Technology Resources =

Non-profit organization in Philadelphia

- Founded: 1974 (refurbishing since 1995)
- Type: 501(c)(3)
- Purpose: Computer Reuse and Education
- Location: Philadelphia, Pennsylvania
- Product: Refurbished technology for the needy and NPOs
- Website: www.ntrweb.org

Nonprofit Technology Resources (NTR) is a charitable nonprofit organization (NPO) inside Philadelphia, Pennsylvania that "serves low-income people in Philadelphia by recycling used computers, providing hands-on work experience, and assisting community-based service organizations to use computers in their work."

== See also ==
- A+ certification
- Camara (charity)
- Empower Up
- Free Geek
- World Computer Exchange
- Digital divide in the United States
- Global digital divide
- Computer recycling
- Electronic waste in the United States
