= Empower Up =

Former electronics recycling center in Washington

- Founded: 2002
- Founder: City of Vancouver
- Dissolved: 2016
- Type: Recycling Center
- Location: Vancouver, Washington
- Origins: Recycling events hosted by Clark County, Washington
- Region served: Oregon and Southwest Washington
- Formerly called: CREAM (Computer Reuse Education and Marketing)

Empower Up, formerly known as CREAM (Computer Reuse Education And Marketing), a 501(c)(3), was a computer recycling center in Southwest Washington based out of Vancouver, Washington. Started in mid-2002, Empower Up took donations of old electronics and computers for recycling, or distributed reusable items to families in the surrounding community.

== History ==
Empower Up's history can be traced back to a collection event started by the City of Vancouver and Clark County in June 2001. The success of this event prompted the city to start another collection in January 2002, specifically for computer recycling of reusable computers and monitors to give back to the community. Interest began to grow among the general public after the second collection.

In mid-2002, after another computer re-usage and recycling collection event, departments of the City of Vancouver created the program, Computer REuse and Marketing, (CREAM). The new organization was to have a permanent location and collection sites, as well as mobile collection units to travel around the area. CREAM was tasked to make sure of the proper disposal of materials in electronics not suitable for redistribution. By 2008, along with the help of Salvation Army Family Services, CREAM had distributed 250 refurbish computers to needy families and recycled 3.5 million pounds (1.6 kt) of electronic waste.

Near the beginning of 2009, due to new laws in Washington, it was recommended that CREAM become an independent non-profit organization. With the help of Habitat for Humanity and Clark County ReStore, the state created a 3-year plan to make CREAM an independent nonprofit. In February 2009, they established their first permanent building in Vancouver.

In April 2010, CREAM's name was changed to Empower Up. The organization established a motto, "Technology Reuse In Action", and created a new logo. In October 2013 Empower Up moved to 3206 N E 52nd Street Vancouver Washington 98663 on St Johns Road. They expanded the Reuse store and added an eBay store.

On August 27, 2016 Empower Up was shut down permanently, citing "economic pressure".

== Media ==
During Empower Up's existence, the non-profit received attention from local and state news sources such as KATU local news, The Vancouver Voice, and The Columbian.

== See also ==
- Free Geek
- Nonprofit Technology Resources
- World Computer Exchange
- Digital divide in the United States
- Global digital divide
