= Digital divide in Ethiopia =

Differences in access to information technologies

The digital divide in Ethiopia refers to inequalities between individuals, households, and other groups of different demographic and socioeconomic levels in Ethiopia in access to information and communication technologies ("ICTs") and in the knowledge and skills needed to effectively use the information gained from connecting.

The digital divide in Ethiopia has caused a massive lack of information for many poorer individuals, however, the greatest failure relates to education. Between intense government regulation as well as economic factors, it is nearly impossible for the average person to access the internet. With such a gross lack of access to technology and the internet, education is stunted and children are forced to rely on archaic, biased, and often unreliable sources of information.

The CIA notes that only 15% of the Ethiopian population is connected to the Internet placing the country at 107 of the 217 countries ranked in the study.

== Education ==
In 2016, the Ethiopian government blocked all social media sites after an anonymous user posted copies of university entrance exams online. In an interview with Reuters News Agency, Mohammed Seid at the Office for Government Communications Affairs, said only social media sites were blocked but BBC News received conflicting reports from Ethiopian citizens who claimed that they experienced problems with both mobile networks and fixed line Internet services.

Roughly 40% of schools in Ethiopia have computers. Of that 40%, most of the schools are located in Ethiopia'a capital, Addis Ababa. This in turn has created a divide between schools in urban cities like Addis Ababa and schools in rural areas. Most schools that are connected to the Internet have limited access and only use it for email that's solely for administrators. Many universities and higher learning institutions in Ethiopia have computers but the average ratio of students to computer is about 10:1. Only 15% of private universities in Ethiopia participate in Electronic Distance Education which is also known as online school. For many students, online education is a more convenient alternative to pursuing higher education because of their location.

There are two major initiatives aimed at bridging the digital divide gap. SchoolNet Ethiopia is a joint initiative between Ministry of Education and the United Nations Development Programme that has equipped 181 schools with 15 networked computer labs. The Distance Learning initiative backed by The Ministry of Education has been working with the Indira Gandhi National Open University in India to provide master's degrees to students from the University of Addis Adaba in Ethiopia.

== Effects ==
In a world almost completely reliant on technology and access to the internet, the digital divide in Ethiopia poses a major problem for its citizens and the effects are nearly detrimental in the current global economy. Without access to the internet, Ethiopia cannot compete with the rest of the world and this has caused many gradual effects. These include lack of education, continued economic depression, and a gross lack of transparency in the Ethiopian government, as well as many other smaller, trickle down effects.

One of the greatest effects the digital divide has one Ethiopia is the lack of education. Approximately 39% of adult Ethiopians can read and a mere 98% of school aged children actually attend school full-time. With an essentially non-existent public education system in this poverty stricken country, the current lack of digital access does not help this matter. An improved access to the internet could help better educate Ethiopian children and with decreased costs as well.

Another effect of the gross disparity in digital access is the economic impact on Ethiopia's economy. Ethiopia is currently one of 19 remaining countries on earth without a true stock exchange. Without access to capital and investments, Ethiopia's economy is growing at a snail pace of 5.4% in 2017. The digital divide plays a major factor in this because without access to technology the economy cannot keep up with the rest of the world.

The Ethiopian government has a well established reputation of being suppressive and corrupt and the digital divide also impacts this. The few citizens with access to the internet who participate in the media are often heavily censored. With access to the internet, freedom of speech would be more easily accessible and less censored. The Ethiopian government would benefit from this because with more fair media coverage there would be less government corruption thus making Ethiopia a more stable country to invest in.

== Gender ==
Ethiopian women experience more barriers to overcoming this digital divide than men, resulting in a gender gap. Many of these barriers are socially constructed through discriminating gender roles. Women's time and mobility are restricted by the expectation placed on them to bear the most household chores and management, keeping them too busy for educational or leisurely use of technology. Technological devices such as radios or movie showings are gendered as masculine tools and toys that are unfit for women. The restriction on time and mobility placed on women to work at home also cuts down on female participation in education, making them less comfortable with the idea of using computers and mobile phones because they believe themselves to not be educated enough to understand the devices or software. The risks of exploitation or exposure to pornography or harassment online also discourage the use of technology.

Women could benefit from measures to increase their access to technology and close the digital divide between the genders. Access to technology and the internet would provide a wealth of information that is vital to entrepreneurship and practicing democracy. Policies and laws that discriminate against women and other social and political inequalities can be discussed and changed by allowing more effective means of communication and organization for those who fight for women's rights.

== See also ==
- Digital divide by country
- Digital Opportunity Index
- Knowledge divide
- Mercedes divide
