= Digital divide in Nigeria =

Internet divide for communication technology

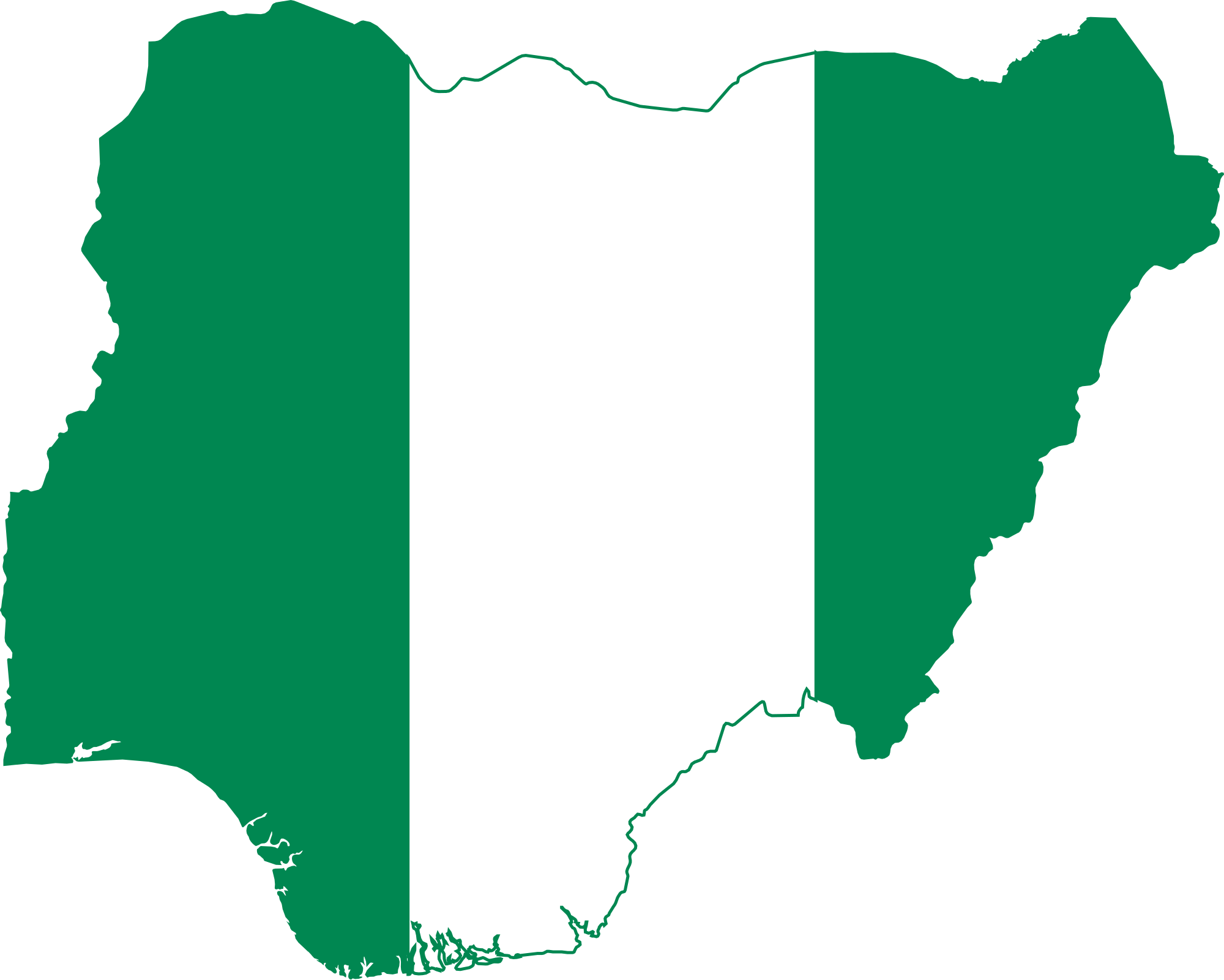

The digital divide is a term used to describe the disadvantage in access to information which people without access to information and communications technology (ICT) suffer. Nigeria's digital divide refers to the inequality of Nigerian individuals, groups, or organizations with regard to access to Information and communications technology (ICT) infrastructure or to the internet for daily activities. The digital divide has been attributed to many factors among which is the high cost of computer equipment, lack of ICT skill and poor knowledge of available search engines. Lack of access to ICT makes it difficult for people to access information. The benefits of having access to ICT are numerous. ICT has the potential to promote other sectors of the economy such as agriculture, education, health, bank, defence etc. In times of emergency, ICT becomes an indispensable tool for overcoming the barriers of time and distance. Education, lack of electrical infrastructure, income, urban drift, and a variety of other social and political factors contribute to Nigeria's growing digital divide.

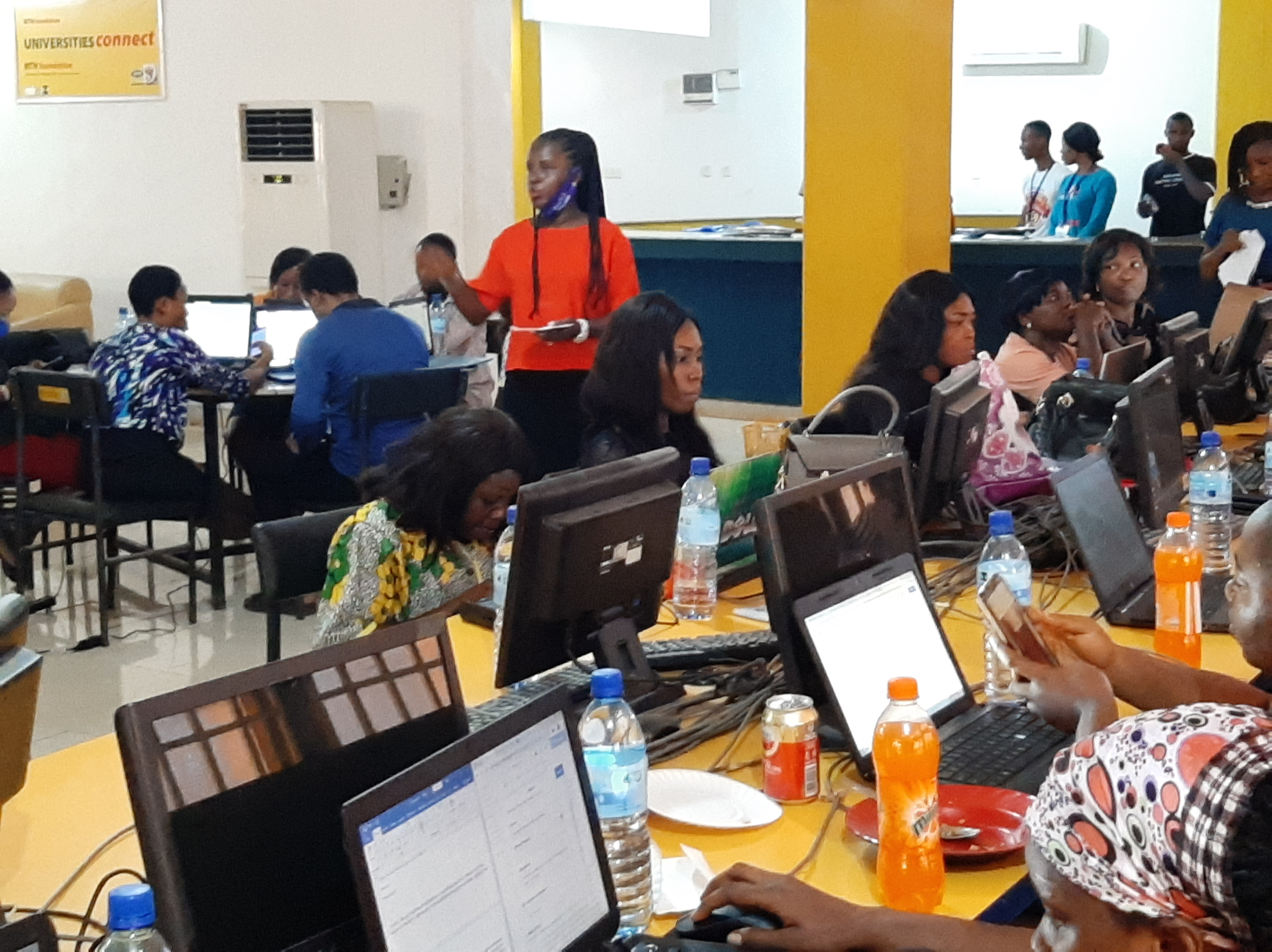
Access to the internet

Efforts are currently being made to reduce the digital divide in Nigeria including collaboration between government agencies and technology corporations like Google, Cchub, Andela, StarBridge Africa, Microsoft and Intel, using libraries as E-learning (theory) facilities, and proposing governmental policies such as salary enhancement and social security. "Gotocourse" a Nigerian owned IT learning and solutions tools organization is also bridging the gap here in Oyo State. They recently launched the first ever AI specifically made for Educators with features like curriculum planner, Assessment Maker, humanizer, speech synthesizer, slide maker etc . Check ( www.gmindai ) Gmind AI

== Causes of digital divide ==
=== Economy ===
Nigeria is Africa's most populous country at 186 million people and sporting an urban vs. rural distribution of 48.3% to 51.7% respectively. Despite its large supply of natural resources and being the second largest oil producer in the world, the Gross domestic product of Nigeria is 1,400 USD per person. Bribery and embezzlement of governmental funds from previous Nigerian leaders cost the Nigerian people the ability to afford access to the latest educational achievements.

=== Illiteracy ===
One-third of Nigeria's populace lack basic literacy, with the proportion of literate to illiterate Nigerians largely dependent on settlement and gender. The table below shows that Nigerians within urban areas are more likely to be literate than those in rural areas and that men are more likely to be literate than women.

In the country, 40% of women who did not own a mobile phone identify illiteracy as a key barrier to ownership, compared to only 22% of men. Only 45% of women (against 62% of men) are aware of mobile Internet, precluding Internet use for over half of the population.

Literacy rates between male and female Nigerians in rural and urban communities.

...	Males	Females
Urban	75%	59%
Rural	51%	34%

== Effects ==
=== Robbed of inclusive educational system ===
An inclusive society is a society in which every person has an equal opportunity to engage in societal dialogue no matter the social class, wealth, education, etc. A person without an education cannot effectively contribute to the modern world. Education teaches skills, ethics, and values which are required to lead a responsible citizen. Education also distinguishes from ignorance and allows a person to face challenges of the modern world. There are many benefits to an inclusive educational system, such as all children form a sense of belonging in their community, encourages parents to participate in their child's education, and allows children to accept individual differences, among children their age.

=== Youth instability ===
Nigeria's youth population has also been significantly affected by the digital divide. Instability has risen among the Nigerian youth as they are overwhelmed by the capabilities and power of ICTs. Illiteracy rates for young men and women are also very high in the rural and urban settlements. Countries with a lot of uneducated youths, like Nigeria, face the risk of restiveness and instability which stalls development and economic development.

== Solutions ==
=== E-learning ===
E-learning is a method of stimulating education, learning through the merging of internet and electronic medias, and is one of systems the Nigerian government are using to bridge the educational gap caused by the digital divide. E-learning makes use of existing information and communications technology infrastructure and available resources lowering a country's economic and financial strain. E-learning also has the added benefits of providing users consistent content and being readily available. Participants of E-learning are also able to work at their own pace, which improves information retention as the program gives immediate feed-back.

=== Computers for All Nigerians Initiative (CANi) ===
The Computers for All Nigerians Initiative (CANi) is a program focused on enhancing Nigeria's economic and social foundation by supplying access to personal computers (PCs) and internet to its citizens. The program is a result of a joint effort between Nigeria's Federal Ministry of Science and Technology (FMST) and its National Information Technology and Development Agency (NITDA) with local banks and PC producers, as well as private technology companies like Intel and Microsoft. In order to avoid supplying CANi Entrants with expensive or poor-quality personal computers, CANi utilizes the aid of government provided subsidies and tax waivers; as well as support from technological companies to develop and produce affordable ICTs.

=== Updating public spaces ===
With qualified personnel on-hand and already existing ICT infrastructure, Nigerian libraries can utilize their resources to serve as e-learning centers. Previously, libraries were more focused towards collecting information than making it accessible. Presently, efforts have been made to upload their print resources to electronic databases. Making these resources, along with ICTs publicly available to the Nigerian people will help enable innovation in managerial and operational processes within libraries. Plans are also being implemented for classes on Information literacy to be taught within these public spaces enabling Nigerians with the critical thinking skills required to locate, process, and effectively use information they find. However, operating and maintaining e-learning facilities and the subsequent ICTs require a steady energy supply to run effectively.

=== Social security ===
Social security is used to help lower the poverty level; it provides those people below the poverty line with the basic necessities, such as food to help their family survive. Social security would give assistance to people by decreasing their fear of acquiring basic necessities and start focusing on closing the digital divide gap.

=== Salary enhancement ===
Salary enhancement is the improvement of salaries for rural workers; this would help close the digital divide gap in rural areas. Salary enhancement would give people an incentive to work harder and gain knowledge about technology. Salary enhancement would also give workers more money to spend on technology; therefore, closing the digital divide gap even more. Salary enhancement would also cause a change in the population of urban and rural areas.

== See also ==
- Digital divide
- Digital divide in Ethiopia
- Digital divide in South Africa
- Digital Divide in Morocco

== Sources ==
This article incorporates text from a free content work. Licensed under CC BY-SA 3.0 (license statement/permission). Text taken from Gender-responsive digitalization: A critical component of the COVID-19 response in Africa, FAO, FAO.

== Reading list ==
- Chitanana, T. (2019). From Global to Local, Metropolitan to Village: A Case for a Definitional and Context-Oriented Approach to Examining the ‘Digital Divide’. In Mutsvairo B. & Ragnedda M. (Eds.), Mapping Digital Divide in Africa: A Mediated Analysis (pp. 45–64). Amsterdam: Amsterdam University Press. doi:10.2307/j.ctvh4zj72.7
- Sam, S. (2019). Bridging the Digital Gap in Sub-Saharan Africa: A Critical Analysis of Illiteracy and Language Divide. In Mutsvairo B. & Ragnedda M. (Eds.), Mapping Digital Divide in Africa: A Mediated Analysis (pp. 215–256). Amsterdam: Amsterdam University Press. doi:10.2307/j.ctvh4zj72.15
- Samuel Ereyi Aduwa-Ogiegbaen, & Ede Okhion Sunday Iyamu. (2005). Using Information and Communication Technology in Secondary Schools in Nigeria: Problems and Prospects. Journal of Educational Technology & Society, 8(1), 104-112. Retrieved May 26, 2020, from www.jstor.org/stable/jeductechsoci.8.1.104
- Odeh, L., & Akinade, M. (2017). CHINA’S FOOTPRINT ON NIGERIA’S TELECOMMUNICATIONS MARKET: THE CASE OF HUAWEI TECHNOLOGIES SINCE 2000. Journal of the Historical Society of Nigeria, 26, 107-121. doi:10.2307/48562081
- Ajayi, Lasisi (2015-06). "Critical Multimodal Literacy". Journal of Literacy Research. 47 (2): 216–244. doi:10.1177/1086296x15618478. ISSN 1086-296X
- Okunola, O. M., Rowley, J., & Johnson, F. (2017). The multi-dimensional digital divide: Perspectives from an e-government portal in Nigeria. Government Information Quarterly, 34(2), 329-339.
- Buys, P., Dasgupta, S., Thomas, T. S., & Wheeler, D. (2009). Determinants of a digital divide in Sub-Saharan Africa: A spatial econometric analysis of cell phone coverage. World Development, 37(9), 1494-1505.
