= Free Geek =

Organization

Coordinates: 45°30′37.27″N 122°39′21.63″W

- Founded: 2000
- Founder: Oso Martin
- Type: 501(c)(3) Nonprofit
- Purpose: Sustainable technology reuse, digital access and technology education.
- Location: Portland, Oregon
- Region served: Portland Metro
- Exec. Dir.: Juan Manuel Muro, Jr.
- Employees: 30-40
- Volunteers: 2000+ active
- Website: freegeek.org

Free Geek is a technology related non-profit organization based in Portland, Oregon, launched on April 22, 2000. It started as a public event at Pioneer Courthouse Square. In September 2000, it opened a permanent facility as a drop off site for electronic waste. In January 2001, local newspaper The Oregonian ran an article advertising their free computer program for volunteers, which became so successful that they had to start a waiting list. They currently have over 2,000 active volunteers per year.

== Free software ==
Free Geek's refurbished computers run Linux Mint and other free and open-source software. The use of free software gives a wide range of software without the need to manage licenses or payment.

Free Geek was a joint winner of the first Chris Nicol FOSS Prize awarded by the Association for Progressive Communications (APC) in 2007.

== History ==
As part of the COVID-19 pandemic, the company received between $350,000 and $1 million in federally backed small business loan from Columbia State Bank as part of the Paycheck Protection Program. The company stated it would allow them to retain 47 jobs.

== See also ==
- Empower Up
- World Computer Exchange
- Digital divide in the United States
- Global digital divide
- Computer recycling
- Electronic waste in the United States
- Telecentre
