= Internet in Korea =

Internet in Korea may refer to:

- Internet in North Korea
- Internet in South Korea
