= Internet in South Korea =

South Korea was one of the first countries in the world to universally adopt broadband Internet connections. As of January 2025, there were about 50.4 million internet users in South Korea, or 97.4% of the population. South Korea long had the world's fastest average internet connection speed, but its global ranking subsequently declined; by late 2022 its average fixed broadband download speed of 171.12 Mbps placed it 34th worldwide according to Ookla's Speedtest data, down from 2nd in 2019. As of mid-2024, it ranked 31st for fixed broadband and 6th for mobile internet speeds. South Korea has consistently ranked first in the United Nations (UN) ICT Development Index since the index's launch. The government established policies and programs that facilitated the rapid expansion and use of broadband. The country has 97.6% of the population owning a smartphone, which is the highest in the world.

It is recorded that Kilnam Chon played a major role in the introduction of the Internet to South Korea. Kilnam Chon said in an interview that in 1982 he started a South Korean network development project. The first Internet message sent from South Korea to the world was done by Hyunje Park in 1990. It is recorded that the e-mail—"I am Hyunje Park from Korea. Anyone who sees this e-mail, please reply."—sent by Hyunje Park received a reply—"I am Torben at the University of Hawaiʻi, United States. Congratulations. You are now connected to the Internet."—soon after.

== National program ==
South Korea has the most DSL connections per capita worldwide. ADSL is standard, but VDSL has started growing quickly. ADSL commonly offers speeds of 3 Mbit/s to 8 Mbit/s, with VDSL accordingly faster. The large proportion of South Korea's population living in apartment blocks helps the spread of DSL, as does a high penetration of consumer electronics in general. Many apartment buildings in built-up metropolitan areas have speeds of up to 100 Mbit/s such as the capital Seoul and Incheon. VDSL is commonly found in newer apartments while ADSL is normally found in landed properties where the telephone exchange is far away.

The Internet has a higher status for many Koreans than it does in the West and the government actively supports this. According to the Information Technology and Innovation Foundation, South Korea's internet is the most developed in the world. Seoul has been called "the bandwidth capital of the world".

== ISP and IDC ==
There are three major ISPs: KT Corporation, SK Broadband (previously Hanaro Telecom), and LG Uplus (previously Powercomm and DACOM). They provide broadband and Internet circuit including Ethernet and operating Internet data centers in Seoul. Major MSOs are LG Hellovision, SK Broadband Cable, DLIVE, HCN and CMB.

== Internet speed ==
As of July 25, 2024, South Korea had the 6th fastest mobile internet and 31st fastest broadband speeds at 139Mbit/s and 150Mbit/s respectively.

== Real name policy ==
There was a government-level law to stamp out anonymity in the South Korean internet environment. It was overturned by the constitutional court.

== Network Fee policy ==
The government is considering passing a bill, wherein online services (e.g. Netflix, YouTube) will have to pay a 'Network Fee' to ISPs depending on how much internet traffic they generate. It is supposed to compensate ISPs for the increased maintenance costs due to increased internet usage. This bill will also infringe upon net neutrality.

== Cyberculture ==
South Korean web culture indicates distinct activities that South Korean Internet users enjoy on the web. Synonyms include cyberculture, technoculture, virtual community culture, post-human culture, and high tech culture. Cyberculture in South Korea is more like a virtual community culture than anything else. Most of the Internet users are in the 10-49 age range. People often access the Internet through cyber cafes (Korean: PC방; PC bang).

Most of the activities are targeted to teenagers and college students. Young people who feel more comfortable texting than talking are known as the "thumb tribe". The LG Mobile World Cup, an international competition held on January 14, 2010, in which participants competed using their texting speed and accuracy was won by a pair of South Koreans.

Highly urbanized at 92%, South Koreans lead a distinctive urban lifestyle; half of them live in high-rises concentrated in the Seoul Capital Area with 25 million residents. The rise of online social activities closely mirrors the wider cultural trend towards shared spaces, such as the habitual use of coffee houses.

South Korea enjoys the world's swiftest Internet speeds and the highest rate of Internet penetration but also suffers from very high censorship of content. Internet culture is particularly prominent in South Korea with its influence of video games, video content, and streaming services.

== Internet addiction ==
Internet addiction is very common across the world. Factors of internet addiction be anything online, whether excessively playing video games, compulsive shopping, going back and forth with social media, etc. Major symptoms of internet addiction consist of "depression, anxiety, isolation, avoidance of work, and some physical conditions of backache, headaches, insomnia, neck pain, etc. Particularly in South Korea, almost 95% of adults own a smartphone which some experts say is becoming increasingly addicted to the Internet. This is because the South Korean environment allows easy access to the internet to almost any online users in the country. Any ages of Koreans can access the internet easily from one neighborhood to another. Almost 20% of the South Korea population are in major risk of internet addiction which advocates to nearly 10 million people according to a 2018 government survey.

=== Issues within the community ===
In South Korea, there are places where anyone can access the internet easily at common places known as "PC Bang" in American terms known as "PC Café". PC Bangs are often "shiny places with big, comfy chairs, huge screens and fast Internet, all for about a dollar an hour". Most of the PC Bangs are open 24 hours a day which is a major cause to internet addiction from ages type ranging from young teenagers to adults. A PC Bang owner in Seoul's upmarket Gangnam neighborhood stated the following "some customers who play too long gets smelly, and other customers start to complain, so we have to ask them to leave". Due to major issues similarly to the owner stating above, Seoul's Hanyang University psychiatrists who studies internet addiction believes that South Korea is facing a public health crisis.

=== Symptoms ===
Although there's major disagreements whether Internet Addiction causes symptoms, "most authors agree that the preoccupation with the Internet and withdrawal symptoms (e.g., dysphoria, anxiety, irritability) when unable to access the internet must be present". Just like many common addictions, symptoms occur whether its alcohol, drugs, gambling, shopping, and many more. Every addiction is unique from one another due to its nature of addiction but behind the addiction are almost too similar due to what it is doing with the brain controlling and manipulating the human to do a certain act based on the type of addiction.

Other symptoms of internet addiction can consist "development of tolerance, repeated inability to cut back on Internet use, disregard for the consequences (physical, psychological, and/or social) of overuse, loss of interest in other activities in favor of Internet use, and Internet use as a means of escape or mood elevation (Tao et al., 2010)". Just like all addictions, there are treatments that are created to treat and solve an addiction.

=== Outlook & treatments ===
Some ways that internet addiction can be solved especially for younger children is for parents to be more proactive when letting children having access to the internet on the daily as well as the number of devices. Parents are critical when it comes to children being addicted to the internet due to the responsibilities it has on the daily usage of internet.

In South Korea, there are "regional education offices that provide services such as in-school counseling, screening surveys, preventive disciplines and, for severe cases, addiction camp". The South Korean government provides and finances most of the camps through the national or municipal levels, which it has been doing for more than a decade.

The internet addiction camp is a place "where people can go to receive help for the unhealthy relationship that they have with the internet". Its purpose is to support those who are in need by becoming more independent from the internet and depict their views when using the internet. The rules are very strict as it does not allow phones and any devices are must be given to the instructors immediately especially like hair straighteners. Its goal is to help the people to find ways to be happier when doing other types of activities like craft sessions, games and activities rather than using the internet. Over 1,200 young people have attended the internet addiction camp since 2014.

== See also ==
- Internet censorship in South Korea
- Net neutrality
- Digital divide in South Korea
- Ministry of Science and ICT
