= Digital divide in the United States =

Differences in access to information technologies

The digital divide in the United States refers to inequalities between individuals, households, and other groups of different demographic and socioeconomic levels in access to information and communication technologies ("ICTs") and in the knowledge and skills needed to effectively use the information gained from connecting.

In 1995, The National Telecommunications and Information Administration (NTIA) conducted the first survey to assess Internet usage among different demographic groups (what the study deemed the "haves" and the "have-nots" of American society). After U.S. President Bill Clinton adopted the phrase "the digital divide" in his 2000 State of the Union address, researchers began to track trends in ICT access and usage across these different groups. NTIA defined the digital divide as "one of America's leading economic and civil rights issues" in their 1999 report "Falling Through the Net: Defining the Digital Divide" (1999).

The effort by the United States' government to close the digital divide has included private and public sector participation, and has developed policies to address information infrastructure and digital literacy that promotes a digital society in the United States.

According to Census data, 18% of households used the internet in 1997 and this usage increased to 62% in 2007 and 73% in 2015. Digital access has risen steadily over the past decade, increasing by 11 percent since 2009, though the digital divide exists between varying demographics based on region, age, race, disability, etc.

== Demographic breakdown ==
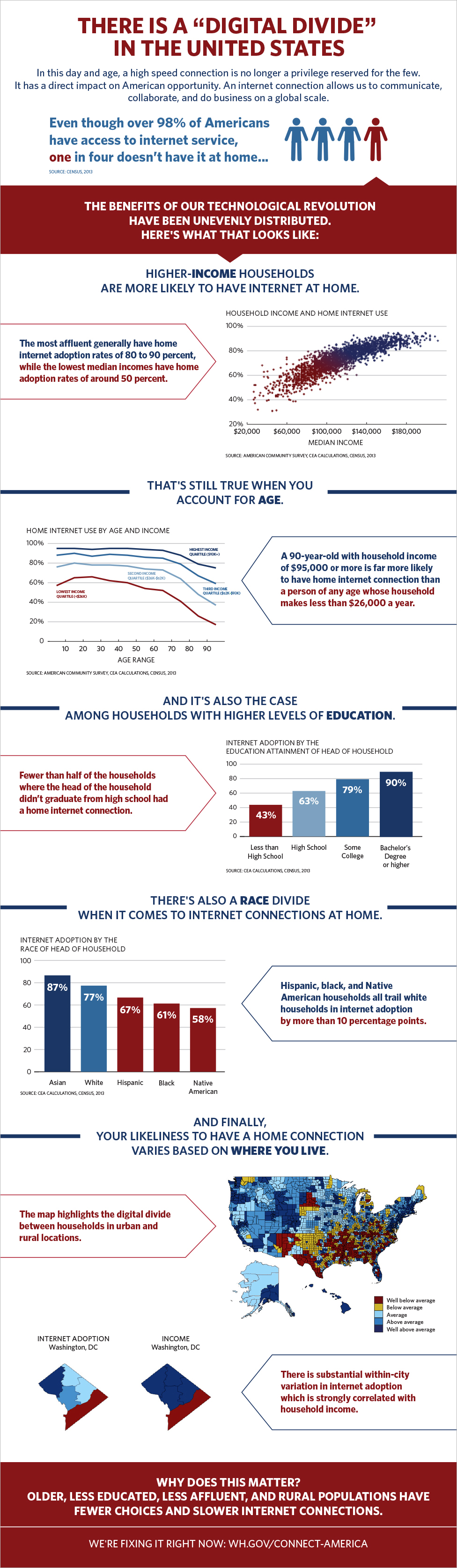
Infographic from the White House on the digital divide in the US

Global context: Digital divide and the Digital divide by continent, area and country.

The 2023 NTIA Internet Use Survey found that 83 percent of people age 3 and older in the United States used the internet, up from 80 percent in 2021. Twelve percent lived in households without any internet connection, down from 14 percent in 2021. Adoption remained unequal by income: 73 percent of people in households earning less than $25,000 used the internet, and 54 percent had both fixed and mobile connections, compared with 80 percent of people in households earning at least $100,000 who had both types of connection. While internet access has increased in the past couple decades, there are disparities between demographic factors such as geography (urban versus rural), gender, age, race, class, and disability.

=== Gender ===
By 2001, women had surpassed men as the majority of the online United States population. When controlling for income, levels of education, and employment, it turns out that women are clearly more enthusiastic ICT users than men. The 2009 Census data suggests that potential disparities in gendered connectivity have become nearly non-existent; 73% of female citizens three years and older compared to 74% of males could access the Internet from their home.

Women in the United States are taking advantage of the freelance employment opportunities the Internet offers. For example, a report in 2018 stated that women make up the majority of online shop owners on Etsy, and the majority of hosts on Airbnb.

Although more women in the United States use the Internet than men, there still remains significant gender gaps in content creation and website development. For example, a 2013 survey found that about 27% of Wikipedia editors from the U.S. were female. In 2009, a Wikimedia Foundation survey revealed that 6% of editors who made more than 500 edits were female, with the average male editor having twice as many edits.

=== Age ===
Older generations of Americans have consistently reported the lowest level of access to the Internet per age cohorts. In 2019, 59% of Americans age 65 and older had access to broadband at home compared to about 80% of other age groups (77% of Americans age 18–29, 77% of Americans age 30–49, and 79% of Americans age 50–64). Although older generations still hold the lowest amount of Internet usage age-wise, the United States has seen a dramatic increase in Internet users at the age of 65 and older over time. From 2000 to 2015, the number of senior citizens connected to the Internet increased by 44%.

Device ownership has drastically increased for Americans age 65 and older over the years but still remains consistently lower than that of all American adults. Data from Pew Research Center shows that smartphone ownership increased from 11% in 2011 to 24% in 2016 (compared to the American average of 35% and 77%, respectively) and tablet ownership increased from 1% in 2010 to 32% in 2016 (compared to 3% and 51%, respectively). In terms of device usage, seniors tended to describe their smartphones as "freeing" and "connecting" and are more likely to use tablets and e-readers.

However, older adults living in rural communities report experiencing symptoms of confusion, anxiety, or lack of support when interacting with technologies, regarding healthcare, which resulted in lower adoption rates of services including telehealth.

=== Race and ethnicity ===
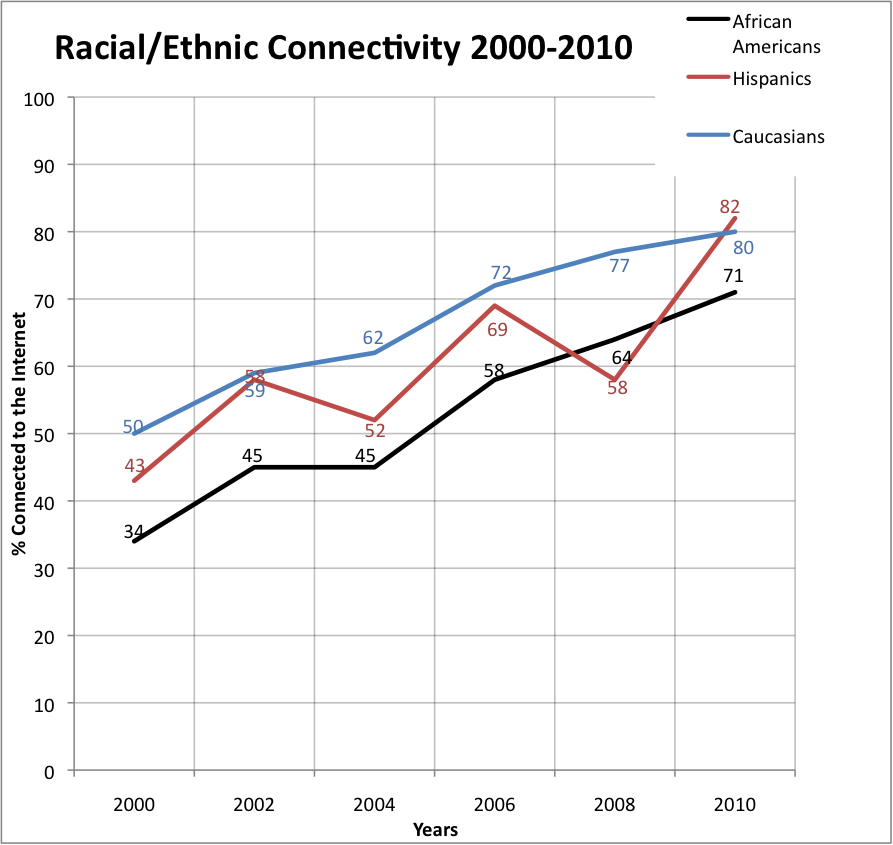
Rising trends in connectivity of Whites, Hispanics, and African Americans

Generally, racial minorities have demonstrated lower levels of access and knowledge ICTs and of owning infrastructure to utilize the connection. In 2000, 50% of Whites had access to the Internet compared to 43% of Hispanics and 34% of African Americans. Between 2000 and 2010, the racial population of Internet users became increasingly similar to the racial makeup of the United States population, demonstrating a closing racial divide. In 2019, 79% of Whites had access to broadband compared to 61% of Hispanics and 66% of African Americans.

English-speaking Hispanics have been the fastest rising ethnic cohort in terms of Internet usage. In 2010, 81% of English-dominant Latinos, 74% bilingual Latinos, and 47% Spanish-dominant Latinos used the Internet. Even though the rate of dominant Spanish-speaking Latinos was lower at the time, it rose significantly from 36% in 2009.

The racial gap for African Americans is most evident within the senior population: in 2003, 11% of African Americans age 65 and older reported using the Internet, compared to 22% of senior Whites. Also in 2003, 68% of 18- to 24-year-old African Americans and 83% of 18- to 24-year-old Whites had Internet access. A similar gap is noted in the 55- to 64-year-old range with 58% of Whites and 22% of African Americans accessing the Internet.

The digital divide can be displayed when individuals must use smartphones in the absence of access to other devices. 41% of African Americans and 47% of English-speaking Hispanics send and receive email on cell phones, as compared to 30% of Whites. Significant differences between the racial groups include sending and receiving instant messages, using social networking sites, watching videos, and posting photos or videos online. In 2019, the ownership to smartphones by race/ethnicity was 82% of Whites, 79% of Hispanics, and 80% of African Americans.

A 2013 study found that "African Americans are more likely than other segments of the population to use the Internet to seek and apply for employment, and are more likely to consider the Internet very important to the success of their job search."

Contemporary researchers such as Anna Everett, André Brock, Safiya Umoja Noble, Lisa Nakamura, and Ruha Benjamin have studied the relationship between race and access to technology in ways that center communities of color and their strategic navigation of inaccessibility for digital autonomy and social mobility.

=== States and Regions ===
Internet connectivity varies widely state by state in the U.S. both in terms of broadband coverage and Internet speed. For example, in 2019, New Jersey ranked the highest in Internet connectivity with the fastest average Internet speed (52.0 Mbit/s) and highest percentage of broadband coverage (99%), and Montana ranked the lowest with the slowest average Internet speed (20.3 Mbit/s) and lowest percentage of broadband coverage (69%).

Internet connectivity also varies by region. In 2016, U.S. Census data showed that nonmetropolitan areas in the South have the lowest percentages of households with computers or Internet connection and Metropolitan areas in the West have the highest percentages. Southern states tend to have higher poverty levels that correlate with low levels of Internet connectivity. For example, in 2016, Arkansas and Mississippi reported the lowest levels of broadband use (71% of households) and both states have low median incomes compared to the rest of the country.

Overall, in 2015, over 75% of urban Americans used the internet in comparison to 67% of rural Americans. The geographic disparities intertwine with racial disparities. In those rural areas, Native Americans have a 67% broadband internet subscription rate as opposed to 82% for non-Native American individuals. Moreover, Native Americans living on Native American land had 53%.

=== Income ===
In 2016, roughly half of all households with an income less than $25,000 owned a desktop or laptop computer. Over 90% of all households with an income over $100,000 owned a desktop or laptop computer. The same relationship can be seen for households owning smartphones, tablets, and Internet/broadband subscriptions.

In 2019, Pew Research Center came out with a report that stated while Internet usage has increased in lower-income households (with annual incomes of less than $30,000), In terms of income disparities, the Pew Research Center reported that 44% of adults in households with incomes below $30,000 do not have broadband access. These households are more likely to be smartphone-only Internet users. This can leave them at a disadvantage when applying for jobs or doing other tasks traditionally formatted for a larger screen. As for its effects on school-age children, in 2015, over a quarter of lower-income students did not have access to broadband Internet at home, leaving them to rely on either smartphones or public library access to complete online homework. In a 2020 report by Common Sense Media, it was reported that 30% of American children in grades K-12 lacked access to broadband Internet and several key types of devices (computers, laptops, tablets), and this was exacerbated for children from lower-income homes. This lack of access can leave them at a disadvantage for accessing educational resources, particularly when distance and remote learning has become popular due to the COVID-19 pandemic.

A reverse divide is also apparent in the choices that parents make for their children and teenagers. Kids in poor families spend more time using digital devices for entertainment and less time interacting with people face-to-face compared to children and teenagers in well-off families. Wealthy families choose child care options and schools that limit or ban screen time. This has led to concerns that wealthy families are buying face-to-face human interaction for their children, with all the benefits that brings to them, while other children will be left with the poor substitute of an artificial game.

=== Educational attainment ===
In 2018, data showed that households where the house owner has a bachelor's degree or higher, desktop/laptop computer ownership exceeds 93%. However, in households where the house owner did not graduate high school, that figure sharply drops to 45%.

The reverse divide is related to education. According to a New York Times article in 2018, the more educated parents are, and especially the more parents know about how computers work, the more likely they are to ban or sharply limit the use of computers, tablets, smartphones, and other digital devices for their children.

=== Reasons given for trends and gaps ===
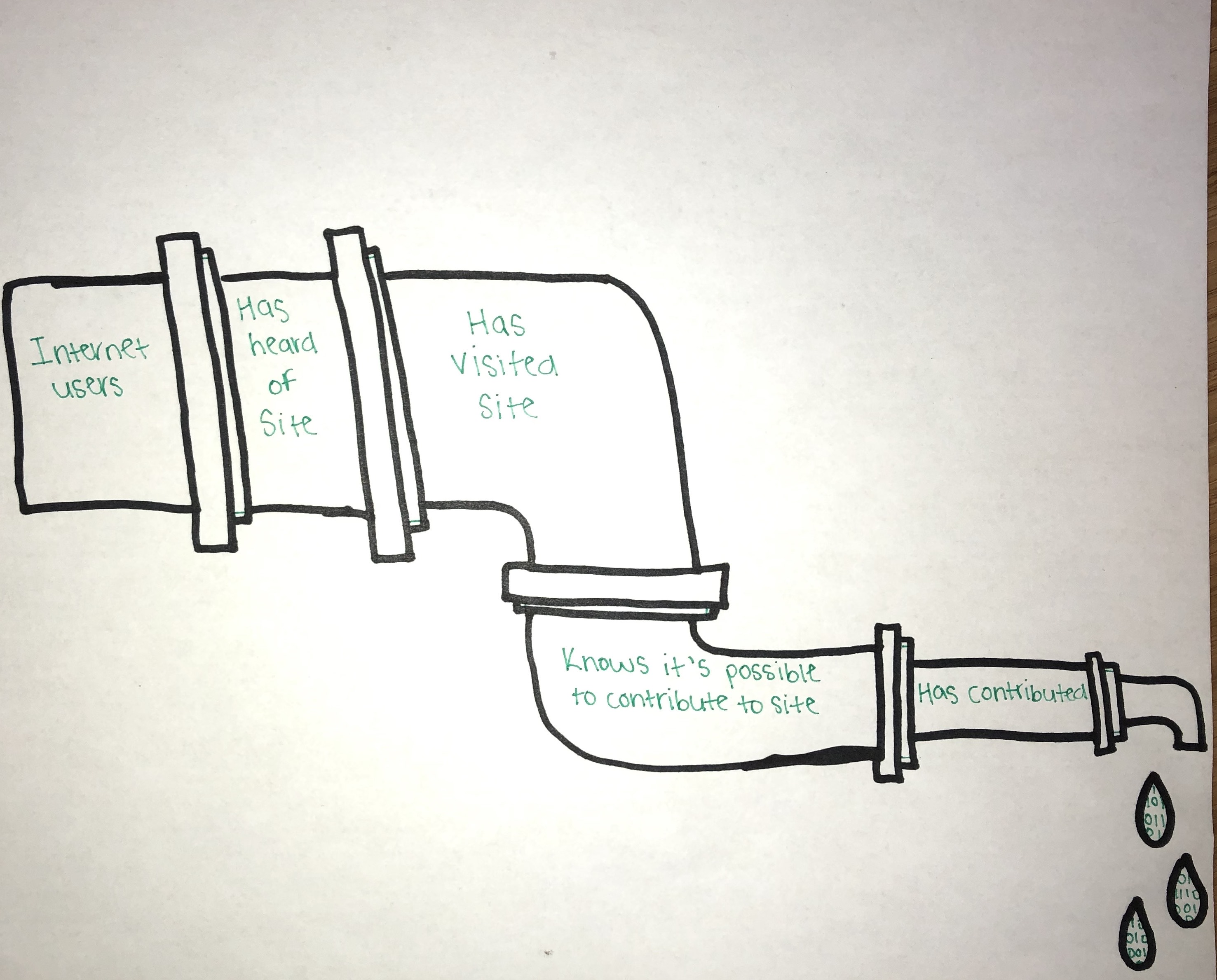
Schematic visualization of Pipeline Model described by Shaw & Hargittai

Shaw and Hargittai (2018) explain that inequities in participatory activity on the Internet (such as on Wikipedia) can be represented as a pipeline model. The steps in their model include: (1) being aware of the site, (2) visiting the site, (3) understanding that it is possible to edit, contribute, or participate on the site, and (4) actually contributing on the site. Thus, gaps in digital knowledge and skills produce gaps in online participatory activity.

In 2018, Jen Schradie examined how different factors drive the digital divide in online participation or digital engagement between lower and higher socio-economic groups. She discusses what she calls ASET resources: access, skills, empowerment, and tools. She asserts that lower-class individuals and organizations have less ASETs, and because of this, have less resources to participate online (such as building a robust online presence or navigating an online space). For example, her research describes that having consistent internet access was a challenge for people who can barely make ends meet. The lack of resources creates feelings of disempowerment. Schradie explains that middle to upper-class individuals not only tended to have more ASETs, but often feel more entitlement and confident in their ability to use digital media.

Data suggest that race, income, and education are intertwined, especially when it comes to the digital divide. Using the ASETs model above, those who are White, higher-income, and more highly educated typically have more ASETs. As a result, these groups tend to have higher digital connectivity. Other research suggests that a part of the digital divide has been driven by language differences, with those with lower English ability have traditionally had less Internet connectivity and usage.

== Means of connectivity ==
=== Infrastructure ===
The Federal Communications Commission (FCC) distinguishes between broadband or high-speed Internet access and dial-up Internet access. Broadband access includes using DSL, cable modems, fiber, wireless, satellite, or BPL. As of 2019, approximately 27% of U.S. adults did not have access to broadband Internet at home.

Additionally, people use different physical mediums that can connect to the Internet such as desktop computers, laptops, cell phones, iPods or other MP3 players, Xboxes or PlayStations, electronic book readers, and tablets such as iPads. Since 2013, Pew Research Center has been tracking the percentage of the American population who they call "smartphone-only Internet users" who do not have home broadband but own a smartphone. This percentage has grown from 8% in 2013 to 18% in 2019. Smartphone-only Internet users are more likely to be adults who are younger (22% of Americans ages 18–29), Hispanic (25%) and Black (23%), from households with annual incomes of less than $30,000 (26%), and with less than a high school degree (32%).

According to a 2019 survey by the Pew Research Center in 2019, smartphone ownership in the United States varies greatly among generations:

- Millennials (born in 1981–1996): 93%
- Generation X (born 1965–1980): 90%
- Baby Boomers (born 1946–1964): 68%
- Silent Generation (born 1945 and earlier): 40%
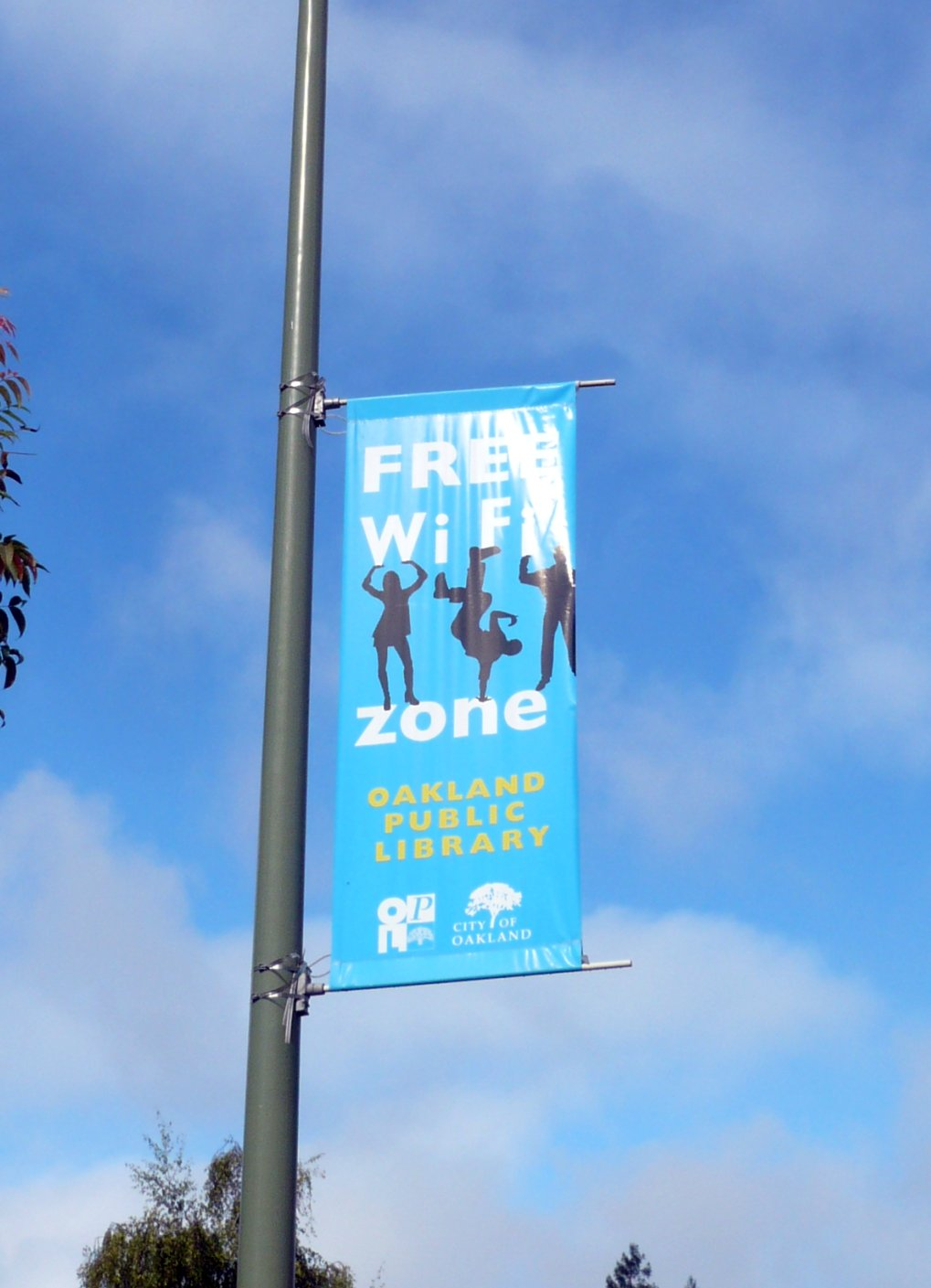
  Picture of free WiFi at a public library

=== Location ===
If Internet is inaccessible from the home, one can often find Wi-Fi connections at restaurants and coffee shops, schools, and libraries. A survey by Pew Research in 2016 found that 23% of Americans 16-years-old and older used wi-fi at a public library. According to the American Library Association (ALA), 98% of public libraries in the United States in 2015 offered free wi-fi. In a 2011 ALA survey, it was shown that the quality of that Internet access can vary, with connections to the community's poverty level and community type. Rural libraries were much less likely to report having fiber optic Internet connections, while a majority of urban libraries reported having it. Rural libraries were also less likely to have connectivity speeds higher than 6.0 Mbit/s.

In 2010, nine out of every ten libraries surveyed by the ALA reported that providing services to job seekers was one of the most important services free Internet services provided. Other important services included providing government information such as tax forms, and educational information to school-aged children.

Over the past few years, some public libraries in the United States have started to lend out hotspots to patrons.

== Purpose of connectivity ==
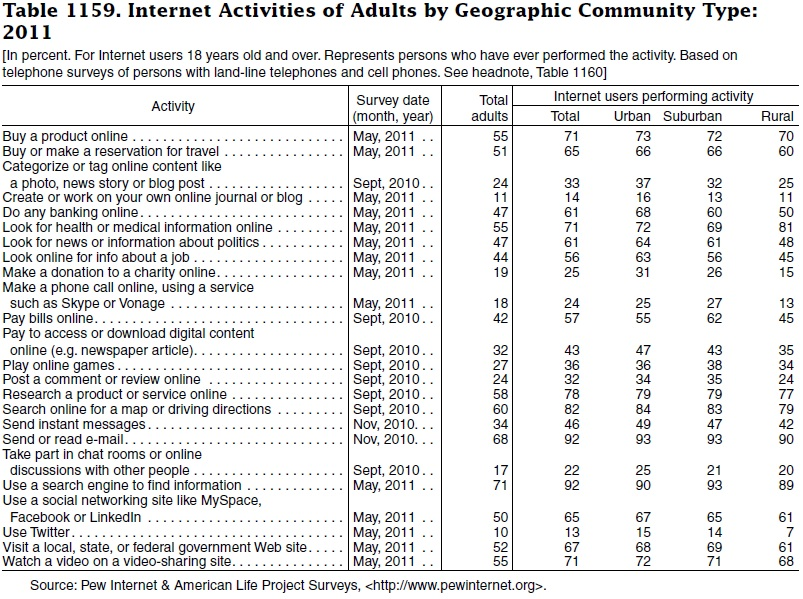
Internet activities ever performed by percentage.

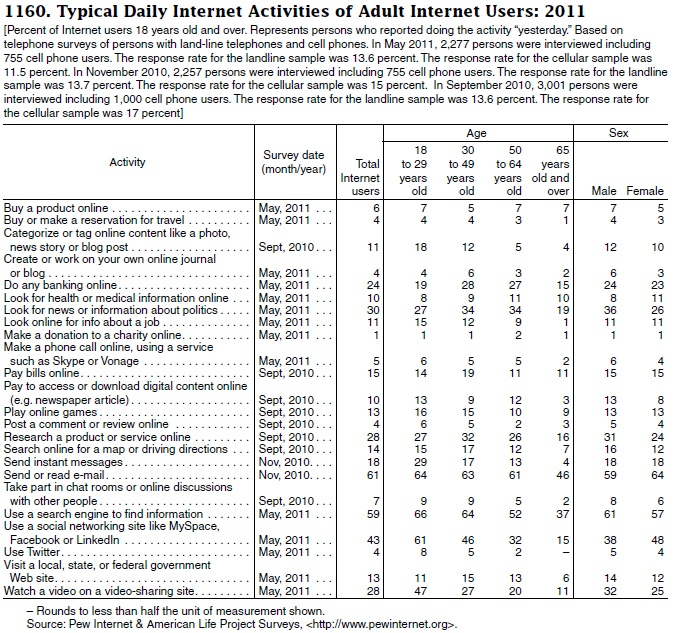
Activities the Internet is utilized for on a daily basis as percentages.

As new applications and software are developed, the Internet has increasingly become utilized to complete a variety of both professional work and personal tasks. To the right of this section are two tables describing the most recent data on the types of activities U.S. citizens utilize the Internet for compiled by the U.S. Census Bureau and presented in its final Statistical Abstract of the United States: 2012.

See also in Education section: digital divide

The digital divide also impacts children's ability to learn and grow in low-income school districts. Without Internet access, students are unable to cultivate necessary tech skills in order to understand today's dynamic economy. The need for the internet starts while children are in school – necessary for matters such as school portal access, homework submission, and assignment research. Federal Communications Commission's Broadband Task Force created a report showing that about 70% of teachers give students homework that demand access to broadband. Even more, approximately 65% of young scholars use the Internet at home to complete assignments as well as connect with teachers and other students via discussion boards and shared files. A recent study indicates that practically 50% of students say that they are unable to finish their homework due to an inability to either connect to the Internet or in some cases, find a computer. This has led to a new revelation: 42% of students say they received a lower grade because of this disadvantage. Finally, according to research conducted by the Center for American Progress, "if the United States were able to close the educational achievement gaps between native-born white children and black and Hispanic children, the U.S. economy would be 5.8 percent—or nearly $2.3 trillion—larger in 2050".

In the COVID-19 pandemic, the digital divide has been exacerbated since workplaces, schools, telehealth, and more have transitioned online. A pulse survey in November 2020 reported that for almost 80 percent of 2000 respondents aged 18+ in the US and UK internet has become more important in their lives as a result of the pandemic. Only 18% of enterprises in the United States have incorporated advanced digital technology or invested in digitalisation in response to the pandemic.

The United States also has a growing digital gap in organizations. Non-digital companies became more dynamic, and 64% of US enterprises that had previously embraced advanced digital technologies increased their investment in digitalisation, while 48% of non-digital US firms began investing in digital technologies following the COVID-19 pandemic. In the US, data from 2021 shows that 22% of companies do nothing in the digital area.

== Lack of connectivity ==
Physical, financial, psychological, and skill-based barriers exist in terms of Internet access and Internet skills for different demographics:

25% of American adults live with a disability that interferes with daily living activities. 54% of adults living with a disability still connect to the Internet. 2% of adults say they have a disability or illness that makes it more difficult or impossible for them to effectively and efficiently use the Internet.

Aversion to the Internet influences an individual's psychological barriers to Internet usage, affecting which involving which individuals connect and for what purpose. Comfort displayed toward technology can be described as comfort performing a task concerning the medium and infrastructure by which to connect. Technological infrastructure sometimes causes privacy and security concerns leading to a lack of connectivity.

Individuals who exhibit computer anxiety demonstrate fear towards the initial experience of computer usage or the process of using a computer. From this, many researchers conclude that increased computer experience could lead to lower anxiety levels. Others suggest that individuals demonstrate anxiety toward specific computer tasks, such as using the Internet, rather than anxiety toward computers in general.

Communication apprehension influences propensity to use only Internet applications that promote engagement in communication with other people such as Skype or iChat.

Bach et al. in “Poverty, Literacy, and Social Transformation” state that technological exclusion is inherently tied to sociology exclusion and that addressing educational equity initiatives must relate to solving the larger poverty systems. In the political lens where digital access is a right, participatory citizenship in the digital era involves the right to participate in higher education, not just access.

== Overcoming the digital divide in the United States ==
=== Information infrastructure ===
Congress passed the American Recovery and Reinvestment Act on February 13, 2009, which was signed into law four days later by President Barack Obama. A portion of the American Recovery and Reinvestment Act designated approximately $7.2 billion in investments to expand broadband access nationwide, improve high-speed connectivity in rural areas and public computer centers, and increase Internet capacity in schools, libraries, public safety offices, and other public buildings.

According to a joint report from The Alliance for the Public Technology and the Communications Workers of America released in July 2008, states developed initiatives before there had been any national-wide action aimed to actively develop an information infrastructure and start to catch up to other countries in respect to the number of households with broadband internet. Broadband initiatives by the states can be broadly classified into seven different types:

- Broadband Commissions, Task Force, or Authority established through legislation or executive order that directs public and private stakeholders to assess the state of high-speed Internet deployment and adoption in the state and recommend policy solutions.
- Public-Private Partnerships convened through executive order or statute to broadband availability, identify unserved and underserved areas, assess supply and demand-side barriers, create local technology teams to implement programs to increase computer ownership, digital literacy, aggregate demand, and accelerate broadband build-out.
- Direct Funding Programs to support the build-out of advanced networks in unserved and underserved areas by leveraging private sector funds to make network investment – and thus Internet service – more affordable
- State Networks operated by public agencies or the private sector connecting schools, universities, libraries and state and local government agencies to reduce costs by aggregating demand. In some cases, public agencies serve as anchor tenants to make middle-mile broadband build-out to underserved communities more economic. At least 30 states have established state networks
- Telehealth networks linking rural clinics with specialists in hospitals and academic institutions. At least 25 states support state telehealth networks.
- Tax Policy with targeted tax incentives for investment in broadband equipment.
- Demand-Side Programs to promote computer ownership, digital literacy, and development of community-based applications and services."

==== Public-Private partnerships ====
Private-public partnerships often present as income-targeted programs, like with Comcast Internet Essentials and cities like Philadelphia. Internet Essentials is a price plan offered to every low-income family with school-age children who qualify for free school lunch as well as low-income seniors and low-income veterans. To expand internet affordability, cities will work with private partners, although there is debate over this approach due to concerns for private sector dominance and monopolies. Internet Essentials is a popular program by Comcast that champions affordability for low-income residents, but the large Internet Service Provider (ISP) has sued cities for attempting to start their own city-owned broadband network. A 2020 article reported that 22 states had substantive legal roadblocks to establishing municipal or government-owned broadband networks. This can be connected to the national dispute over net neutrality, the principle that ISPs should enable access to all content and applications regardless of the source, and without favoring or blocking particular products or websites.

===== State Networks =====
In 2013, 2,000 cities had public electric utilities, 400 had any kind of public broadband network, and only 150 had fiber optic networks. While, it is not as common to find fully municipally owned power or broadband, there are cities like the City of Chattanooga, Tennessee, with the first high-speed fiber-optic broadband network. The City started its own fiber-optic network in 2013, leveraging the existing capacity of its City energy company, the Electric Power Board, for deployment. Some propose that broadband can be treated like a public good, a non-rival and nonexclusive resource in which everyone can access it.

Municipally owned broadband networks still have the possibility for public-private partnerships. For example, municipalities could lease publicly owned fiber networks to private ISPs and provide individual strands of fiber and ask ISPs to pay upfront costs for fiber construction with a small operating cost. Similarly, the city can serve as a middle-mile/last-mile provider, where they lease space on the fiber network to other vendors who then offer commercial broadband services directly to the customer. This theory of this can be exemplified in city-provided public Wi-Fi, implemented in Cities like San Leandro. The City of San Leandro has a fiber network from a License Agreement with San Leandro Dark Fiber that is approximately 14 miles of conduit and fiber strands throughout the city. In exchange, the city has ownership of 10 percent of the fiber installed by San Leandro Dark Fiber. In addition to this, San Leandro partners with over 100 ISPs to provide competitive leasing.

=== Notable Initiatives ===
In 1993, the U.S. Advisory Council on the National Information Infrastructure was established and administered a report called A Nation of Opportunity that planned access to ICTs for all member of the population and emphasized the government's role in protecting their existence.

Founded in 1996, the Boston Digital Bridge Foundation attempts to enhance children's and their parents' computer knowledge, program application usage, and ability to easily navigate the Internet. In 2010, the City of Boston received a 4.3 million dollar grant from the National Telecommunications and Information Administration. The grant will attempt to provide Internet access and training to underserved populations including parents, children, youth, and the elderly.

Starting in 1997, Cisco Systems Inc. began Cisco Networking Academy which donated equipment and provided training programs to high schools and community centers that fell in U.S. Empowerment Zones.

Since 1999, a non-profit organization called Computers for Youth has provided cheaper Internet access, computers, and training to minority homes and schools in New York City. Currently, the agency serves more than 1,200 families and teachers per year.

The Tomorrow's Teachers to Use Technology established by the Department of Education was given almost $400 million between 1999 and 2003 to train teachers in elementary and secondary schools to use ICTs in the classroom.

In 2000, Berkeley, California established a program that facilitated digital democracy in allowing residents to contribute opinions to general city plans via the Internet.

The National Science Foundation gave EDUCAUSE (a non-profit that attempts to enhance education with ICTs) $6 million to focus on providing ICTs to Hispanic-Serving Institutions, Historically Black Colleges and Universities, and Tribal Colleges and Universities.

In 2000, President Clinton allocated $2.34 billion to provide low-income families at-home access to computers and the Internet, to install broadband networks in underserved communities, and to encourage private donation of computers, businesses or individuals to sponsor community technology centers, and technology training. An additional $45 million was added to emphasize provision of ICTs to underserved areas.

In 2003, the Gates Foundation contributed $250 million to install more than 47,000 computers and train librarians in almost 11,000 libraries in all 50 states.

In 2004 in Houston, Texas, a non-profit organization called Technology for All (TFA) established a free broadband Wi-Fi network in an underserved community, Pecan Park. An additional grant in 2010 assisted TFA, in collaboration with Rice University, in upgrading their Wi-Fi network to a new long-range version, a "Super Wi-Fi" in order to enhance network speed and computer quality.

In June 2004, Hon. Gale Brewer (D-Manhattan), Chair of the Select Committee on Technology in Government (now the Committee on Technology) in conjunction with a graduate student Digital Opportunities Team at CUNY Hunter College, supervised by Professor Lisa Tolliver in the Departments of Urban Affairs and Planning), published a study and recommendations titled Expanding Digital Opportunity in New York City Public Schools: Profiles of Innovators and Leaders Who Make a Difference. The report was one of numerous initiatives and events implemented by the Select Committee, which includes roundtables, conferences, hearings, and collaborative partnerships.

In 2007, projects called One Laptop per Child, Raspberry Pi and 50x15 were implemented in attempting to reduce the digital divide by providing cheaper infrastructure necessary to connect.

In 2007, the use of "hotspot" zones (where people can access free Wi-Fi) was introduced to help bridge access to the Internet. Due to a majority percentage of American adults (55) connecting wirelessly, this policy can assist in providing more comprehensive network coverage, but also ignores an underprivileged population of people who do not own infrastructure, so still lack access to the Internet and ICTs.

The Broadband Access ($76 billion) and Community Connect ($57.7 million in grants) programs administered by the US Department of Agriculture (2007) and the e-Rate program administered by the Federal Communications Commission are the pillars of national policies intended to promote the diffusion of broadband Internet service in rural America.

Since 2008, organizations such as Geekcorps and Inveneo have been working to reduce the digital divide by emphasizing ICTs within a classroom context. Technology used often includes laptops, handhelds (e.g. Simputer, E-slate), and tablet PCs.

In 2011, Congresswoman Doris Matsui introduced the Broadband Affordability Act, which calls for the U.S. Federal Communications Commission (FCC) to subsidize broadband Internet service for low-income citizens, assisting in closing the gap between high-income and low-income households. The Act would expand the program to offer discounted internet service to lower-income consumers living in both urban and rural areas. The bill was introduced on June 14, 2011, but was not enacted and died in the 112th Congress.

In 2014, Congressmen Bill Foster introduced the ‘‘Closing the Digital 5 Divide for Students Act of 2014’’, which amends the United States Housing Act of 1937 and is aimed at providing affordable internet for residents in low-income housing. It was last referred to the House Committee on Financial Services in 2015.

In 2020, federal fiscal commitments include the Consolidated Appropriations Act passed on December 27, 2020, which is a $7 billion fund for broadband initiatives under the Coronavirus Response and Relief Supplemental Appropriations Act. Additionally, in March 2020, the Federal Communications Commission created the Keep Americans Connected Pledge for broadband and telephone service providers to ensure that Americans do not lose their broadband or telephone connectivity due to COVID-19 circumstances.

=== Social capital ===
The majority of research on civic engagement and social capital shows that the Internet enhances social capital in the United States, but others report that after controlling for background variables, civic engagement between users and non-users is not significantly different.

Of those who do believe that the Internet promotes social capital, a longitudinal study in Pittsburgh found that Internet usage increased rates of individual participation in community activities as well as levels of trust. Additionally, these increased levels of involvement were greater for participants who had previously been the least involved. Of those who use the Internet in the United States, studies have found that these individuals tend to be members of community social networks, participate in community activities, and exhibit higher levels of political participation.

=== Economic gains ===
The United States is the world leader in Internet supply ecosystem, holding over 30% of global Internet revenues and more than 40% of global Internet net income. Its lead primarily stems from the economic importance of and dependence the United States places on the Internet, since the Internet makes the United States' economic activity faster, cheaper, and more efficient. The Internet provides a large contribution to wealth: 61% of businesses who use the Internet in the United States saved $155.2 billion as a result of ICTs as more efficient means toward productivity. In 2009, the Internet generated $64 billion in consumer surplus in the United States. In the United States, the Internet promotes private consumption primarily through online shopping. In 2009, online purchases of goods and services totaled about $250 billion, with average consumption per buyer equaling about $1,773 over the year. That same year, the Internet contributed to 60% of the United States' private consumption, 24% of private investment, 20% of public expenditure, and 3.8% of the GDP.

Between 1995 and 2009, the Internet has contributed to 8% of the GDP's growth in the United States. Most recently, the Internet has contributed to 15% of the GDP's growth from 2004 to 2009. The American government can also communicate more quickly and easily with citizens who are Internet consumers: e-government supports interactions with American individuals and businesses.

Additionally, widespread use of the Internet by businesses and corporations drives down energy costs. Besides the fact that Internet usage does not consume large amounts of energy, businesses who utilize connections no longer have to ship, stock, heat, cool, and light unsellable items whose lack of consumption not only yields less profit for the company but also wastes more energy. Online shopping contributes to less fuel use: a 10-pound package via airmail uses 40% less fuel than a trip to buy that same package at a local mall, or shipping via railroad. Researchers in 2000 predicted a continuing decline in energy due to Internet consumption to save 2.7 million tons of paper per year, yielding a decrease by 10 million tons of carbon dioxide global warming pollution per year.

== See also ==
- Achievement gap
- Center for Digital Inclusion
- Civic opportunity gap
- Digital divide
- Digital divide by country
- Digital Opportunity Index
- Digital rights
- Information society
- International communication
- Internet geography
- Internet governance
- List of countries by Internet connection speeds
- Knowledge divide
- Mercedes divide
- National broadband plans from around the world
- NetDay
- Net neutrality
- Rural Internet
