= Mercedes divide =

The phrase "Mercedes divide" was spoken by United States Federal Communications Commission (FCC) Chairman Michael Powell at the initiation of his chairmanship of the FCC in January 2001. He used the phrase as his response to a question posed about the digital divide, which refers to the gap between people with effective access to digital and information technology and those with very limited or no access at all.

The statement took place during a press conference in which he stated "I think there is a Mercedes divide. I would like to have one, but I can't afford one." .

The short quip suggests Powell believed that computer and internet access was more a luxury than a necessity. In the full context of his response, Powell elaborated that the digital divide should be addressed by the agency without harming the "early stages of innovation" with what he considered unnecessary regulation.

== See also ==
- Digital divide in the United States
