= Knowledge divide =

The knowledge divide is the gap between those who can find, create, manage, process, and disseminate information or knowledge, and those who are impaired in this process. According to a 2005 UNESCO World Report, the rise in the 21st century of a global information society has resulted in the emergence of knowledge as a valuable resource, increasingly determining who has access to power and profit. The rapid dissemination of information on a potentially global scale as a result of new information media and the globally uneven ability to assimilate knowledge and information has resulted in potentially expanding gaps in knowledge between individuals and nations. The digital divide is an extension of the knowledge divide, dividing people who have access to the internet and those who do not. The knowledge divide also represents the inequalities of knowledge among different identities, including but not limited to race, economic status, and gender.

== Overview ==
In the 21st century, many countries are shifting toward what scholars call a knowledge society, where information, ideas, and technology play a major role in shaping economies and everyday life. Manuel Castells describes this shift as the rise of the “network society,” meaning digital communication and ICT link people and institutions in ways that completely change how societies function (Castells, 1996). Because technology develops so quickly, societies now rely heavily on people who can create, manage, and share knowledge, making education and digital skills more important than ever.

However, even though technology has made information more accessible, it hasn't closed the gap between groups with different educational backgrounds. The knowledge gap hypothesis argues that people with higher socioeconomic status tend to absorb information from mass media faster than those with fewer resources, which widens the gap over time (Tichenor, Donohue, & Olien, 1970). This idea still fits today because individuals with strong digital literacy benefit more from the explosion of online information, while others may have trouble keeping up or using technology effectively.

Overall, the rise of the knowledge society opens up opportunities for innovation and economic growth, but it also reinforces divides between people who can navigate large amounts of information and those who cannot. Reducing this divide requires not just access to technology, but also stronger education systems and digital literacy programs so everyone can participate in a knowledge-driven world.

== Between nations ==
According to UNESCO and the World Bank, knowledge gaps between nations may occur due to the varying degrees by which individual nations incorporate the following elements:

- Human rights and fundamental freedoms: An absence of freedom within a society can diminish or delay the ability of its members to acquire, debate, and transmit knowledge. Vital to the spread of knowledge and information between nations are such freedoms as freedom of expression, an absence of censorship, free circulation of information, and freedom of the press.
- Democracy
- Plurality of knowledge and information: This includes a diverse media and the acceptance of diverse forms of knowledge.
- Quality infrastructure: For instance, a poor electrical grid makes the existence of computer networks or of higher education institutions less attainable.
- Effective communication system: This will affect the dissemination of knowledge or movement of ideas within and between nations.
- Effective education system: Gaps in knowledge between nations can exist when individual countries invest too little in primary school education, which acts as the base for the entire education system. According to UNESCO, in order for a nation to become a knowledge society, primary education must focus on basic literacy and must be universally accessible. However, as others have pointed out, higher education may be equally important for closing knowledge gaps between nations, particularly between newly industrialized nations, such as the Republic of Korea, and more advanced industrial societies. For the former, higher education can play an important role in bridging knowledge gaps, but must benefit more than a small elite portion of the population and must be taught at international standards. The poor development of educational institutions from a society affects the creativity of people belonging to that society.
- Focus on Research and Innovation: As the World Bank suggests, Research & Development within a nation can enable it to follow current developments in global knowledge and also to understand how to adapt external knowledge and technology to meet its needs. In nations with low degrees of R&D, government funding can provide a significant portion of support that can later be taken over by private investment. Closely tied to effective education systems is the need for a nation to allow for academic freedom. Because higher educational institutions are significant contributors to R&D, these institutions must be granted freedom to create and disseminate knowledge. An environment supportive of research and innovation may also help stem the "brain drain" of educated individuals from knowledge-poor nations to knowledge-rich nations.
- Intellectual Property Rights: Closely connected to a focus on research and innovation are national and international Intellectual Property Rights. Within a nation, Intellectual Property Rights can spawn research and innovation by providing economic incentives for investing in new knowledge development. However, as stated by the World Bank, by protecting innovations, intellectual property rights may also inhibit knowledge-sharing and may prevent developing nations from benefitting from knowledge produced in other countries.

== The knowledge divide in gender and socioeconomic status ==
First, it was observed that a significant difference exists between first-world and third-world countries (developed countries vs. developing countries). The development of knowledge depends on the widespread adoption of the Internet and computer technology, as well as the advancement of education in these countries. If a country has achieved a higher literacy level, it will result in a higher level of knowledge. Indeed, UNESCO's report highlights numerous social issues related to the knowledge divide and globalization. There was noticed a knowledge divide was noticed with respect to

- Gender: Visible disparities in knowledge acquisition and utilization persist between men and women, such as unequal access to educational resources and essential technologies, which create the conditions for unequal access to knowledge. This can cause significant knowledge gaps both within and between nations, the latter resulting from individual nations' underutilization of their full knowledge workforce. The latter is fundamentally a consequence of nations failing to fully leverage their potential human capital by underutilizing the entire knowledge workforce, which has a detrimental impact on global capacity for innovation and economic growth.

A gap in terms of education has been noticed, as Women from developed countries are more likely to strive for decent-paying jobs and to live independently. Meanwhile, women from underdeveloped countries tend to lack the knowledge and skill set for decent-paying jobs and often end up working manual labor jobs.

- Socioeconomic: A knowledge divide can be observed through economic statuses, especially between high and low-income families. This divide between families is nearly 20 to 40 percent, with the gap being doubled in third-world countries. Individuals from lower socioeconomic backgrounds exhibit a reduced propensity to pursue higher education, primarily due to financial constraints and resource limitations. Empirical research substantiates this trend, indicating that only 51% of individuals from low-income families matriculate in higher education institutions, compared to an exceeding 89% from high-income families.

This division can impact other aspects of people's lives beyond education, particularly in terms of informational use and understanding. Based on the 2008-2009 American National Election Studies panel data, research has found that socioeconomic status is most closely related to informational use of the internet than access to the internet, and the differential use of the internet between socioeconomic groups is associated with a larger knowledge gap.

== Closing the knowledge divide ==
Scholars have made similar possibilities in closing or minimizing the knowledge divide between individuals, communities, and nations. Providing access to computers and other technologies that disseminate knowledge is not enough to bridge the digital divide, rather importance must be out on developing digital literacy to bridge the gap. Addressing the digital divide will not be enough to close the knowledge divide, disseminating relevant knowledge also depends on training and cognitive skills.

== See also ==
- Digital citizen
- Digital divide
- Knowledge gap hypothesis
