= Digital divide by continent, area and country =

The digital divide is an economic and social inequality with regard to access to, use of, or impact of information and communication technologies (ICT). Factors causing the divide can vary depending on the country and culture, as can the potential solutions for minimizing or closing the divide.

The following is a list of some of the countries or areas by continent that have a digital divide along with contributing factors and steps the country is taking to resolve the issue.

== Americas ==
=== Argentina ===
The availability and access to the Internet in Argentina shows how the trends of a digital divide stay constant, even across different countries and cultures. Age is one of the main factors, and Argentina's statistics show a common disparity between ages. According to TNS Infratest, the age group with the highest rate of daily internet users in 2016 were users under 25. 91% of that age demographic were polled as being daily internet users. In contrast, the age group with the lowest rate were users over 55, with only 68% of that demographic being daily internet users. The older one is, the less likely they are to use Internet, and these statistics reflect that. The way that users are able to access the Internet can also show the status of Internet and how easily one can utilize it. In Argentina, 48% of users preferred to use a smartphone or tablet to a computer, 29% used them equally, and 16% preferred a computer to a smartphone or tablet.

==== Education ====
The quality of life in Argentina is one of the highest in South and Latin America, according to InterNations. The children are well educated in school, and they are given numerous opportunities to pursue afterwards. The Government created a project named "Conectar Igualdad" (Connecting Equality) where they distribute netbooks to students and teachers in primary school, special needs schools, and state institutes. Since the project began nearly 4,000,000 netbooks have been dispersed amongst them to 400 different schools and 7,500 different teachers. The program works in three parts: an internet connection to Wi-Fi, an established internet connection through a reliable network (giving students Internet access anywhere, even at home), and making use of a syntonizer for Digital TV, allowing students access to interactive live programs. In 2011, the Government launched another program named "Escuelas de Innovacion" (Schools of Innovation). The main goal is to guarantee students better access to education and technology. The Government of Argentina creates new and innovative projects each year for students and teachers to have greater access to the Internet. It plays an important role in their education and is a great opportunity for students and teachers to close the gap in the digital divide.

=== Canada ===
The digital divide in Canada is impacted by several factors that include the differences in the availability of online connectivity resources in different locations across the country, levels of digital literacy, and economic levels.

=== Colombia ===
The digital divide in Colombia refers to the absence of Information and Communication Technology (ICT) and how it affects Colombian individuals and its society as a whole. The main lapse of technology and information lies in the physical access realm of things, where it is lacking tremendously. Though Internet in Colombia has made progress compared to recent years, the scholarly part of how ICTs are used are still in question. With this being said, government officials have made certain that access to ICTs be a priority in their country. In addition to physical access, literature review and types of internet use have also been main points of focus in regards to a solution for digital divide in Colombia.

=== Mexico ===
Regional map of Mexico, by Peter Fitzgerald

In Mexico, half of the population does not have access to the internet. In 2017, 50.4% of Mexican households had access to the internet and 45.4% had a computer. The digital divide in Mexico is related to low income, education, lack of proper infrastructure, and geographical location.

==== Reasons for the Divide ====
Wealthier Mexicans are more likely than poorer Mexicans to have access to the internet. Because of certain dominant players monopolizing the telecommunication sector in Mexico, the majority of the Mexican population cannot afford the expensive services of television and internet.

Formal schooling is scarce in the poor regions of Mexico leaving many school-aged children without internet access. Those who have only received an elementary education are four times less likely to access or use the internet. In Mexico, 33% of primary and 48% of secondary schools have access to the internet and report having one computer. The government has addressed the issue by providing technologies that provide the capability to access the internet, but teachers and students are not instructed on how to use them.

Mexico's lack of proper fiber optic infrastructure causes less wireless broadband penetration in the country, which in turn affects the number of internet users in Mexico. Fiber optic infrastructure is found more in urban than rural areas. Urban internet usage is significantly higher than rural internet usage. In big cities such as Mexico City, citizens doubled the national average in terms of computer ownership. In 2000, the southern border states of Mexico had half as many phones per capita as the northern states.

=== United States ===
The digital divide in the United States has decreased since it was initially detected, however there are still portions of the country and certain groups that have limited or no access. Groups impacted by the digital divide can include certain income brackets, ethnicities, and the less educated. There is also a gap between rural and non-rural areas in America. Rural Americans have made large gains in adopting digital technology in recent years, but they remain less likely than nonrural adults to have home broadband, smartphones and other devices. This is not necessarily because of a financial issue, but because of the lack of access and the poor internet connection due to the lack of towers and phone lines. Mobile technology use among rural adults has risen rapidly, however they are still leaps and bounds behind Americans in larger cities that have more access. As of 2016, approximately 11.5% of the total U.S. population did not have internet access. Out of the 324,118,787 Americans, there were 286,942,362 total internet users (88.5%).

== Africa ==
=== All ===
The digital divide is generally wider in Sub-Saharan Africa, as those countries experience widespread poverty. There are reportedly only 7% of the continent's inhabitants that are online. However, mobile phone usage is shockingly high at 72%. Only 18% of these phones are smartphones. The lack of Internet usage can partially be attributed to the fact that the most common language used on the Internet is English. However, it can also be attributed to the fact that the literacy rate in African countries is not very high. To combat the digital divide in Africa, economists have suggested stimulating the economy of the region. Bridging the digital divide was a major concern of those at the International Telecommunication Union Telecoms World conference in Durban, South Africa. The forum stressed the need for African governments to key into ITU's initiative for Africa, which emphasized infrastructure, investment, innovation and inclusivity. Furthermore, entrepreneurs were encouraged to address the specific challenges that Africans face in regards to accessing the Internet.

In a study conducted in 2011, they estimate that internet access is only available to roughly fourteen percent of the African population.^{[2]} This means that while the world's population is only composed of fifteen percent of Africans, around six percent of that subscribe to the internet.^{[3]}

The COVID-19 crisis has further emphasized the existing digital divide and especially the gender gap. It is estimated that 3.6 billion individuals are not connected to the Internet across the globe, including 900 million in Africa. Only 27 percent of women in Africa have access to the Internet and only 15 percent of them can afford to use it. Digitalization in Africa is also hampered by structural challenges, such as access to electricity, Internet connectivity, poor or weak infrastructure, policy environment and regulations, and the limited ability of individuals to use the digital solutions. It is worth noting that nearly 300 million Africans live further than 50 km from a fibre or cable broadband connection. Hence the lack of widespread availability of broadband Internet also represents a major hurdle, particularly for people living in rural and remote areas, to fully harness the potential of digital transformation.

==== Poverty and Poor Infrastructure in Africa ====
Even though technology has become more and more affordable, there is still a disparage between poor people's access to Internet and wealthy people's access to Internet. This becomes an issue once children begin school, as kids who are in low income school systems do not have access to technology in which they are not granted technical skills to develop to continue their education and later translate those skills to the workplace. This low level of computer literacy can be attributed to poor infrastructure and high costs to stay connected. In 2000, the entirety of Sub Saharan Africa had less telephone lines than Manhattan as a whole.

The poor infrastructure in Africa makes it much more difficult for economic development because countries are unable to develop technologically. Particularly, landlocked countries face major difficulties due to the fact that there are rarely any port cities in these countries, not giving them much trade power. It is estimated that investment in better roads increased investment in telecommunications would help further develop the infrastructure in the continent. Furthermore, the differentiating languages between the existing countries and pre-existing differences between different cultures provides a barrier to Inter-Continental development.

==== Internet Access ====
According to 2011 estimates, about 13.5% of the African population has Internet access Internet in Africa. Africa accounts for 15% of the World population, but only 6.2% of the world's population is African. However, these statistics are skewed due to the fact that most of these Internet users come from South Africa, a country that has a much better infrastructure than the rest of the continent. The rest is mainly distributed among Morocco and Egypt, both countries that have better infrastructures than the majority of the countries in Africa, yet not as strong as that of South Africa. There have been many initiatives in the U.S. to push for better infrastructure which would eventually lead to better Internet access in Africa. Gallup did a survey in 2019 and again in 2021, which is an indicator of internet levels during COVID-19. Their survey noted that overall internet access rose 10% during those years.

=== Sub-Saharan Africa ===
SSA is the fastest growing region in terms of Internet connectivity, with a compound annual growth rate of 4.6 percent and an additional 167 million projected subscribers by 2025, which will take the total subscriber base to just over 600 million, that is, approximately half of the total population.

An increasing number of solutions are being developed to improve the livelihoods and resilience of farmers by taking advantage of the decreasing cost of digital technologies. For example, satellite observation and geodata are being leveraged to create new solutions for supporting social protection and financial service provision. At farm level, the application of specific digital technologies can lead to positive impacts on productivity, improve farmers’ incomes and livelihoods and make farmers more resilient to the effects of climate change. For example, digitalization through mobile technologies can connect farmers to supply chains, service provision, and directly to markets and consumers, maximizing profitability by avoiding intermediaries.

SSA has also one of the widest mobile gender gaps in the world. Over 74 million women are not connected. The Internet penetration4 rate in 2019 was 33.8 percent for men and 22.6 percent for women. The Internet user gender gap was 20.7 percent in 2013 and up to 37 percent in 2019. The gender gap in mobile ownership was 13 percent, a reduction from 14 percent in 2018; however, in low- and middle-income countries it remains substantial with fewer women than men accessing the Internet on a mobile. Furthermore, women are less likely to use digital services or mobile Internet and tend to use different mobile services than men.

In addition to variations among countries, there is also a significant gap between rural and urban areas. For example, in Uganda the urban gender gap in mobile ownership is 4 percent while the rural gender gap is 22 percent, more than five times that of urban areas. In Senegal, women in urban areas are 11 percent less likely than men to use mobile Internet, compared to 32 percent in rural areas.

=== Ethiopia ===
The digital divide in Ethiopia has caused a massive lack of information for many poorer individuals, however, the greatest failure relates to education. Between intense government regulation as well as economic factors, it is nearly impossible for the average person to access the internet. With such a gross lack of access to technology and the internet, education is stunted and children are forced to rely on archaic, biased, and often unreliable sources of information.

The CIA notes that only 15% of the Ethiopian population is connected to the Internet placing the country at 107 of the 217 countries ranked in the study.

=== Morocco ===
The digital divide is an issue for countries like Morocco who are trying to provide improved internet availability to its people. While internet is available to a majority of people in city centers, rural locations are still without access. There exists some restrictions on telecommunication services and limited service providers to choose from. This acts as a block for Moroccan internet users because the lack of competition can become costly. The cost associated with internet services also prevents those who are more economically disadvantaged from accessing the same types of services.

==== Limitations to Internet Access ====
Some of the main limitations for access are education, gender, and age. People with lower education are less likely to access technology or further their professionalism in the information technology field. Moroccan women can often find that they do not have the same sort of opportunities to technology professions and internet usage. The United Nations Development Fund for Women (UNIFEM) was formed to increase opportunities for women and a project called "Achieving E-Quality in the IT Sector in Morocco" has been set up for women to be presented with, increasing their professionalism. Ten universities currently participate in this project in an active effort to close the gender gap within the digital divide.

There is a discernible age gap between individuals who are active on social media and the internet and those who are not. Those aged 14–25 tend to be more familiar with the different social trends and access them much faster than the older generations. A large attribution to this is the lack of literacy in many adults. In 2010, 56% of Morocco's population was illiterate. While children able to go to school are learning to read, write and use various forms of technology; many of their parents do not have access to these same resources and may not have had access while they were growing up. The largest city of Morocco, Casablanca, has a population of 3,544,498 as of 2016. Around 57.6% of the people throughout Morocco had access to the internet in 2016 while the rural population was 39.32%. With a little over half of the population having access to internet many adults that lack literacy skills are currently living in rural areas with minimal access and usage of the internet, yet for their children they have the opportunity to occasionally access the internet through schooling.

==== Solutions ====
The government of Morocco has become increasingly involved in closing the digital divide being experienced by the country. Morocco lags behind in the digital world and steps are actively being taken to fix this. One plan that has been put in place is called “Maroc Numeric 2013”. This plan was initiated in 2013 in an attempt to get Morocco more involved in the digital world as well as provide some protections for internet users. This plan has the potential to boost the nation's economy by creating jobs. The plans passed in government legislation also work to reduce some of the costs associated with internet connection and usage by ensuring that internet services can operate on a free market with little to no control unlike the newspapers and television stations of the region. Despite efforts by the Moroccan government there is still some gap in digital connection among its people. The wealthier population still has higher internet access than those that are poorer. There has been some improvement with the help of free market competition to make access to the internet more readily available to all people.

According to Samuel Lee, Fabian Seiderer and Lida Bteddini, one potential solution could be increasing and improving the lines of communication between the Moroccan government and its people who have expressed much interest in being involved with legal legislation and having more access to knowledge online. A final solution might be updating the original plan, “Digital Morocco 2013” that was put in place in an attempt to bridge the digital divide. While the plan has led to some improvement, connectivity and usage of the internet is still limited to the more educated and urban regions of the Moroccan kingdom.

=== Nigeria ===
The digital divide in Nigeria is impacted by education, lack of electrical infrastructure, income, and urban drift, as well as a variety of other social and political factors contribute to Nigeria's growing digital divide. There have been efforts to reduce the digital divide by both government agencies and technology corporations.

In Nigeria, 40% of women who did not own a mobile phone identify illiteracy as a key barrier to ownership, compared to only 22% of men. Only 45% of women (against 62% of men) are aware of mobile Internet, precluding Internet use for over half of the population.

=== South Africa ===
South Africa's Digital Divide is being bridged by programs like Isifundo. This program provides computer literacy for South Africans who would otherwise not receive any training. They set up centers that provide access to computers and the internet. Their Facebook keeps people up to date with computer-related news and other helpful programs in South Africa.

== Asia ==
=== Bangladesh ===
The digital divide in Bangladesh is a gap in the population of Arshads who can access information and communication technologies (ICTs) and those without proper access or skills.

==== Government and Community ====
Information and communication technologies use in Bangladesh began to grow in 2005 with the introduction of market liberalization.

The government has been trying to help increase ICT availability to all Bangladeshis by reducing taxes on the VSAT and creating special projects to support the spread of ICTs. In 2006 the largest mobile phone company in Bangladesh, GrameenPhone Ltd, introduced Community Information Centers (CICs), which are each equipped with two computers, printers, digital cameras and web cameras that can be used by the community. "There are over 500 CICs operating in 450 subdistricts in Bangladesh". Within the community, there is research suggesting that men benefit more from ICTs than women due to Bangladesh's gender discrimination. Bangladesh has the potential to grow and gain more access to ICTs if they continue to reduce government limitations and grow their economy.

==== Education ====
The education system in Bangladesh is divided up into three stages of schooling: primary school, secondary school, and a level of more formal education. Primary school lasts for five years for children aged 6 to 10, secondary school lasts for seven years, and the formal education level can last anywhere from two to six years. Government policies have been implanted since 2000 that has caused the Information Technology (IT) industry to grow in Bangladesh. Students started going to school in order to become a part of this growing workforce, taking lessons in English language, analytical thinking, and software development. The youth of Bangladesh are becoming educated in the technology available, which is a step in ending Bangladesh's part in the global digital divide. A country can have access to technology but if the people do not understand how to use the technology than there is no difference between having it or not. Satisfaction and gratification from using the technology are key points in bridging the gap because the sense of accomplishment give the people confidence to use the technology.

=== China ===
Over the past decade, there has been an increase in the use of information and communications technologies (ICTs) in China. As the largest developing country in the world, China faces a severe digital divide, which exists not only between mainland China and the developed countries, but also among its own regions and social groups.

Sites in which allow for the regular and free interaction between Chinese citizens, generally come with some restrictions. This will include social media sites, forums, and other sites which are heavy on user interactivity. Google has also been heavily restricted in China and this includes all of its different features.

=== Middle East ===
The gender digital divide in Middle Eastern countries causes women to have far less access to the internet than men. Statistically, women are held at lower standards in the Middle East, which is a reason for this digital division. Males are using the internet at a 47.7% rate with women at only 39.4%.

=== Japan ===
The digital divide in Japan is the disparity of access to the Internet by the population of Japan. Multiple factors influence this divide. Cultural aspects of Japanese people contribute to the digital divide in the nation. Contributing cultural factors to the digital divide present in Japan are closing over time. Groups shown to be improving access include women and the elderly. 97.1% of the households in Japan have Internet access at home while 81% of the households in Japan have personal computers.

The 2015 population census of Japan was released, under 15 years of age are about 16 mil which is 12.6% of the total population. 76 mil of the population is the age 15–64 years of age which is 60.7% of the total population and 3.3mil are 65 years and higher are 26.6%.

=== Malaysia ===
The digital divide in Malaysia is impacted by several factors, which includes age, location, and wealth. Malaysia's status as a non-fully developed country has impacted the availability of technology and the internet, as the lack of access to information communication technology may cause the country to fall even further behind in the progress of worldwide technology if this issue is not addressed and mended. But recent development has helped to increase the use of internet, such as much cheaper mobile prepaid plans, home fibre internet and varieties brands of smartphones.

=== Myanmar ===
The digital divide in Myanmar is impacted by gender and economic class. Wealthy and powerful persons tend to have better access than those who are poor and men typically have more opportunities to get involved in the tele-infrastructure business. The tele-infrastructure in Myanmar is relatively weak compared to those in surrounding countries. The internet supply doesn't meet the increasing demand; hence the digital divide.

==== Economic issues ====
Myanmar is a country with low income level and most internet access is on cellphones, because of the low simcard cost. The people who live above the poverty line have all kinds of modern-day access unlike the average or poor who struggle in the everyday necessities. In 2009 it was recorded that 0.94 percent of Myanmar's population had cell phone subscriptions, due to low trade and economic power. The people who live above the poverty line have all kinds of modern-day access unlike the average or poor who struggle in the everyday necessities. In 2016 Myanmar's Gross Domestic Product (GDP) averaged $1,275.02 US dollars, which contrasts with that of the United States at an average of $57,466.79.

==== Myanmar internet demographics ====
The amount of internet users in Myanmar has increased significantly in the last few years. In 2014, there were 2 million internet users in Myanmar. That number, however, increased to 39 million users by 2016. The cause of this drastic increase in internet users was caused mainly by the massive increase in SIM card sales recorded through May 2016. This combined with a more aggressive network roll-out by mobile providers to other regions, a decline in SIM card prices, the lowered prices of voice and data plans, and the lowered cost of mobile phones all led to this major increase in mobile sales and subscriptions over that two-year period. Because this market is beginning to reach its maturity stage, significant slowdown is predicted to occur by 2022.

==== Gender digital divide ====
Nearly 30% of women are less likely to have access to a mobile device in Myanmar. The cell phone is the main source of internet access in the country. Because of this deficit in internet access between the genders there is a Gender Digital Divide in Myanmar. There is also a significant wage gap between men and woman in addition to limited leadership positions available to be filled. Due to this woman are not as equally represented and often listed as a dependent. This gap contributes to the lack of resources, furthering the lack of digital activity for women. Currently Myanmar is working to close the gap by using more ICT's in daily life in order to educate women. However, due to the economic difference between to genders, women are less likely to have access to ICT's. "IREX's Tech Age Girls (TAG) program is addressing this gap in opportunity, providing more than 100 young women in Myanmar with the technology and leadership skills they need to achieve their goals and become agents of change."

=== Nepal ===
According to mid-September MIS Report from Nepal Telecommunication Authority, 53 percent of the Nepal population uses or has access to the internet. Some of the reasons for this divide are factors such as location, age, and education. Prior to the 1950s Nepal had closed itself off due to geopolitical reasons, however after the Rana Regime was abolished in 1951 the country began to adopt and develop many modern sciences within the government. A 2011 study has shown that while things like age and education levels did impact Internet usage, things such as income levels and telephone ownership did not and that over half of Nepal's Internet users apply the Internet to educational purposes rather than commercial or personal purposes. Lack of technology literacy in Nepal is also a major contributing factor to the widening of the divide.

==== Economic Possibilities ====
===== Rural areas vs. Cities =====
The Nepal government usually focuses their resources on important necessities such as clean water, roads, and healthcare, as the country is still poor and developing, and most of their population lives in rural parts of Nepal. People living in these rural areas are less likely to have access to technology, Internet, or phone lines.

===== Languages =====
Nepali is the national language of Nepal and is spoken by 44.6% of the Nepalese people. However, despite this, Nepal is home to 123 various languages. English is included in this and is spoken fluently at an estimated 2-10%. This mixture of diverse languages contributes to the digital divide as most computer content is written in English, making technology inaccessible to non-English speaking people who could otherwise afford and use a computer.

==== Solutions ====
There have been some attempts to close or lessen the digital divide in Nepal, such as Mahabir Pun's Nepal Wireless Networking Project, which was launched with the intent to help bring wireless technologies. Some areas are also holding classes in digital literacy in order to help people in rural areas gain knowledge and experience with technology. The courses will provide the Nepalese with skills that they are able to utilize in their schooling and careers. The widening digital divide in Nepal has also prompted the government to step in, due to worries that the lack of digital literacy will have a negative impact on the country and its economy. Officials are working towards closing the gap by introducing new programs that will give people the ability to utilize technology more easily than before. Large brand name companies are also making efforts to eliminate the digital divide in Nepal. Microsoft Nepal is providing resources to improve digital literacy as well as increasing access to technology.

=== Pakistan ===
Internet access in Pakistan began in the 1990s and has continued to grow over the past decades. In fact, Pakistan has about 32 million internet users. However, according to data collected by the World Bank, Pakistan has an overall population of about 193 million people. In addition, Pakistan also has about 15 million people who access the internet from their mobile devices. Pakistan has 5 broadband internet providers and 10 DSL. Broadband use through computers is the number one way that people access the internet in Pakistan. The second most popular way that people of Pakistan access the internet is through their cellular devices. Even though there are about 32 million internet user compared to a large population, Internet in Pakistan is ranked 20th in the world.

=== Philippines ===
In the Philippines about 47 to 50% of the population can and has access to the Internet. Initially the Philippines only had BBS (Bulletin board system) access, however after March 29, 1994, the Philippine Network Foundation (PHNet) connected the country to the web via Sprint. As of 2010, 29.3 million Filipinos were using the internet. The digital divide is impacted by several factors that includes income and education. Jim-yong Kim, president of the World Bank Group, has stated that “We must continue to connect everyone and leave no one behind because the cost of lost opportunities is enormous. But for digital dividends to be widely shared among all parts of society, countries also need to improve their business climate, invest in people's education and health, and promote good governance.”

=== Saudi Arabia ===
Saudi Arabia's internet penetration rate reached 99.6% in 2025. The rate was 99.8% among males and 99.4% among females.

=== South Korea ===
The digital divide in South Korea is mainly caused by the unevenness of economic, regional, physical, or social opportunities, leading to marginalized persons not receiving the benefits that technology can bring. The lack of adaptation to the informatization of social services, such as administration and welfare, results in limited opportunities for basic daily life and social participation. South Korea's information gap was initially due to economic reasons and the difference in the initial cost for using the Internet or PC, but recently there has been a gap between the users of the information according to the degree of utilization of information. As the information society rapidly developed, the distribution of the Internet quickly accelerated in Korea, dividing people into two groups, people who are well adapted to the changes and those who are more familiar with the previous media. Although the percentage of local population with internet access is high in Korea, the average rate of internet usage is 99.9% for the young and 64.3% for the elderly.

=== Thailand ===
Thailand's digital divide is impacted by its status as a developing country within Southeast Asia as well as several other factors that include income, choice of technologies, and socioeconomic factors. ICT development and mobile penetration are strongly correlated with economic growth and social benefits.

=== Vietnam ===
The digital divide in Vietnam stems from sociopolitical, economic, and technological issues, but over the last decade since 2010 the country has made great strides in providing large-scale Internet access and more lax restrictions in order to bridge this gap. Though the majority of Vietnam is rural, more than half of the country's population has access to the Internet. Despite these limitations on technology, organizations around the world are working directly with the people of Vietnam to close the digital divide.

== Europe ==
=== France ===
The Digital Divide refers to the gap in exposure to technology needed to access the internet and online resources amongst a population. This gap leads to a decrease in the standard of living for those without access to technology while the standard of living for those who do have access to technology increases exponentially. The global digital divide has been an issue for hundreds of years and is far from a new phenomenon. Currently, in most countries, the digital divide is becoming notably less wide due to an increase in availability of affordable electronic devices capable of accessing the internet and has led to an extraordinary increase in competition amongst technological markets. An increase in competition has resulted in increased exposure to new technology with internet access in even the lowest income areas. Despite the increased exposure to technology, there are still other elements of technological access that contribute to the gap. These disparities continue to contribute to the gap that divides nations and prevents historically underprivileged groups from meeting the societal standards that will allow them to thrive in current society.

The three digital divides in France are characterized as generational, social and cultural differences, according to a report released by the Center for Strategic Analysis in the French government. The generational gap generally affects the elderly since they are the most unfamiliar with newer technologies. The social divide affects the poor since they are less likely to have the budget for technological devices. The cultural divide affects the least educated of the French since they have fewer opportunities for properly utilizing technology.

=== Germany ===
Germany's digital divide is impacted by several factors that include age, gender, family structure, education, ethnicity, and motivation. There are still areas in Germany that lack access to high-speed internet and large cities tend to have more access to the internet than rural communities. In 2006, the (N) Onliner Atlas recorded that only 51% of small rural communities (pop. < 5,000) were Internet users, eleven points less than their urban counterparts in large cities (pop. > 500,000), where Internet usage rates averaged 62%.

=== United Kingdom ===
Internet usage is highest in areas of larger population and corresponding size. Major urbanized cities such as London and Manchester have internet usage ranging from 84 to 89% and 75-83%, respectively. Areas with increased internet usage seem to be more centrally located in respect to the entire region of the United Kingdom. The coastal, more rural areas like Western Wales have internet usage rates of 59-70%. Men in the United Kingdom are more likely to use the internet than women are. When comparing internet usage, The Office for National Statistics found that 91% of men, compared to 89% of women had used the internet recently. Around 9.7% of women have never used the internet, while only 7.1% of men have never used the internet.

=== Poland ===
In Poland, as in other countries, in addition to wealth and access to the Internet, an important factor is belonging to the technological culture, which includes the knowledge of the English language, technical skills and cognitive skills. According to CBOS 25% aged 65 or above and 51% aged between 55 and 64 use the internet, compared with the overwhelming majority of young people; 100% aged 18–24 and 96% aged 25–34 according to the study.

Although the internet usage rate in the richest societies ranges from about 60% to 75%, the overall trend is not increasing; the digital divide creates three social strata: the information elite, the participating majority and the disconnected and excluded.

== See also ==
- Digital equity

== Sources ==
This article incorporates text from a free content work. Licensed under CC BY-SA 3.0 (license statement/permission). Text taken from Gender-responsive digitalization: A critical component of the COVID-19 response in Africa, FAO, FAO.
