= Computer Aid International =

Not-for-profit organization

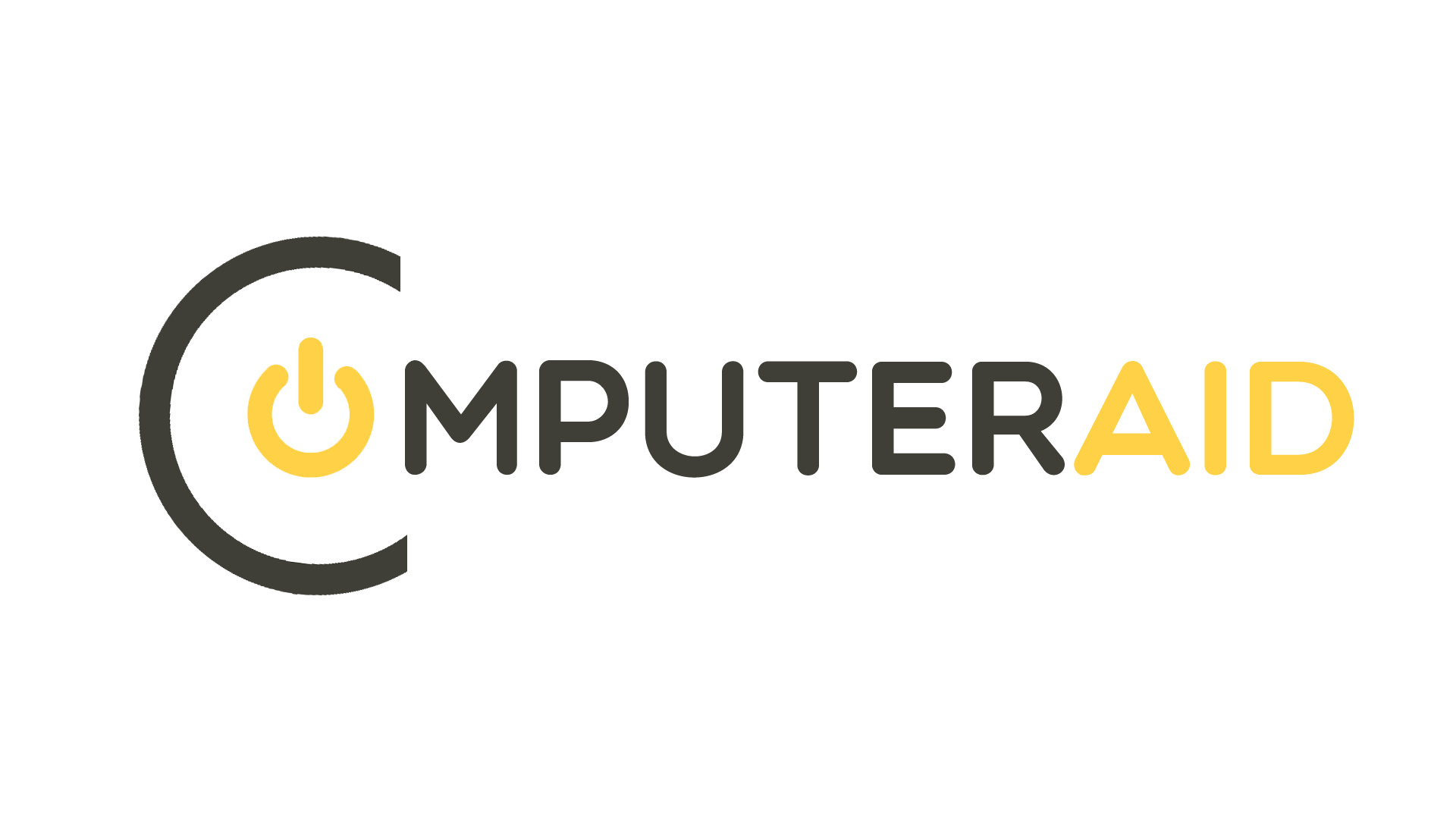
- Founded: 1997
- Founder: Tony Roberts
- Type: International organisation
- Registration no.: 1069256
- Location: 33 Foley Street, London, W1W 7TL, UK
- Region served: Worldwide
- Website: www.computeraid.org

Computer Aid International is a not-for-profit organisation active in the field of Information and Communication Technologies for Development. A registered charity, Computer Aid was founded in 1997 to bridge the digital divide by providing refurbished PCs from the UK to educational and non-profit organisations in developing countries.

Computer Aid has provided over 267,000 refurbished computers to educational institutions and not-for-profit organisations in more than 110 countries.

== Organization ==
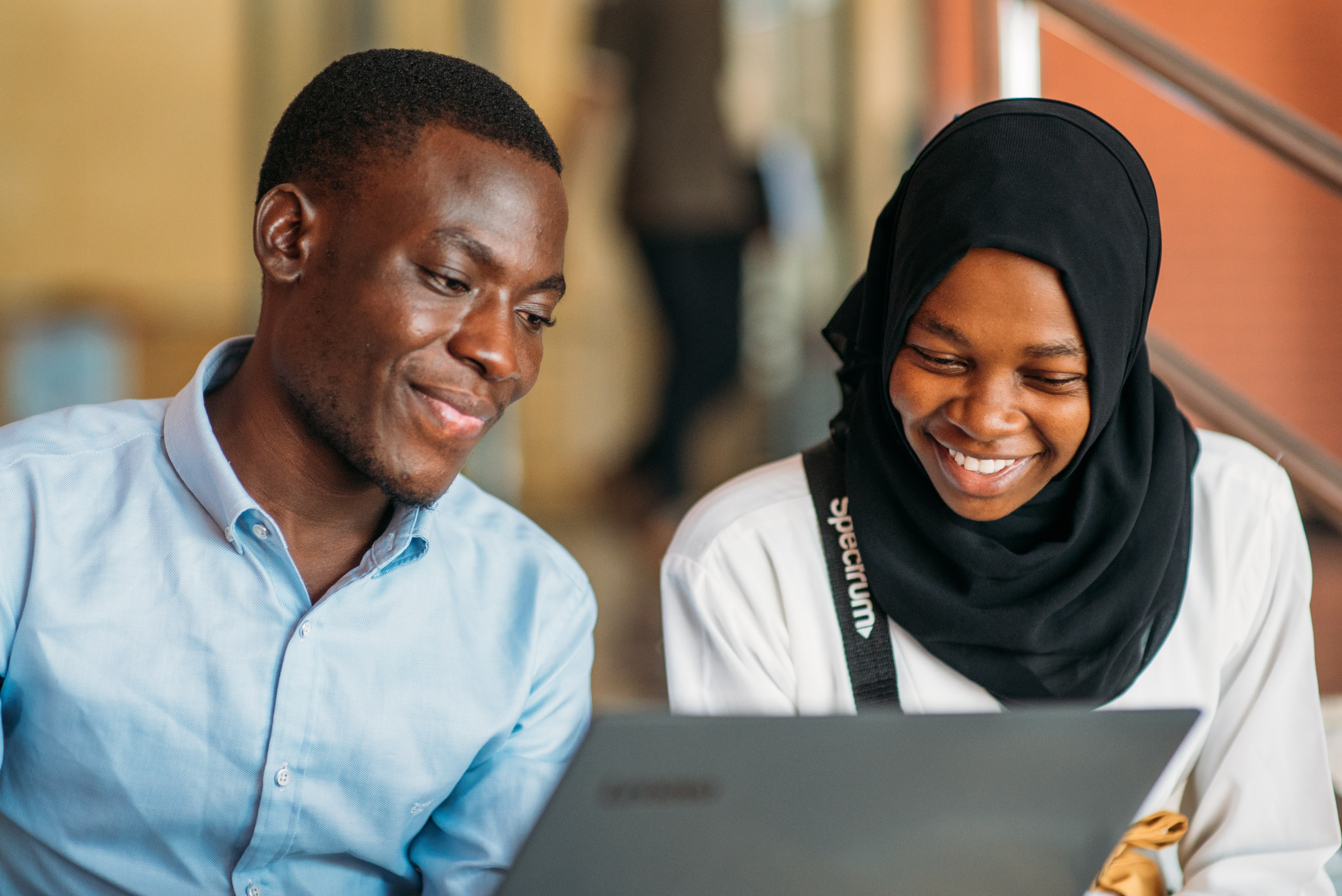
Students at the University of Malawi using equipment supplied by Computer Aid

Computer Aid International is a non-governmental organisation registered with the Charity Commission of England & Wales and is a not-for-profit social business.

Computer Aid has offices in London, South Africa and Kenya. At the Africa HQ in Nairobi,

Computer Aid has a board of trustees that meet quarterly to provide strategic direction and fiduciary oversight.

Denis Goldberg was Computer Aid's Honorary Patron.

== Strategy ==
Computer Aid offers a decommissioning service to UK companies, government departments and universities that are upgrading their computer systems – donated PCs are data-wiped, refurbished and tested. Non-profit organisations in the developing world can apply for refurbished computers for educational projects. They also run their own projects, such as Digital Schools where computer labs are set up.

== UK IT Donors ==
Computer Aid has partnered with Tier 1 to offer a secure service to UK companies and organisations replacing their hardware. The charity provides end-of-life IT asset management services, which include data removal, computer refurbishment, reuse, and recycling.

== See also ==
- Computer technology for developing areas
- Geekcorps
- Geeks Without Bounds
- NetCorps
- Random Hacks of Kindness
- United Nations Information Technology Service (UNITeS)
