= Eric Rasmussen =

Eric Rasmussen may refer to:

- Eric Rasmussen (academic) (born 1960), American professor of English
- Eric Rasmussen (baseball) (born 1952), American baseball player and coach
- Eric Rasmussen (physician) (born 1957), American physician
- Eric Rasmussen (politician) (1926–2006), American politician from Nebraska

== See also ==
- Erik Rasmussen (disambiguation)
- Eric Rasmusen, American economist
