= Computer hardware =

Physical components of a computer

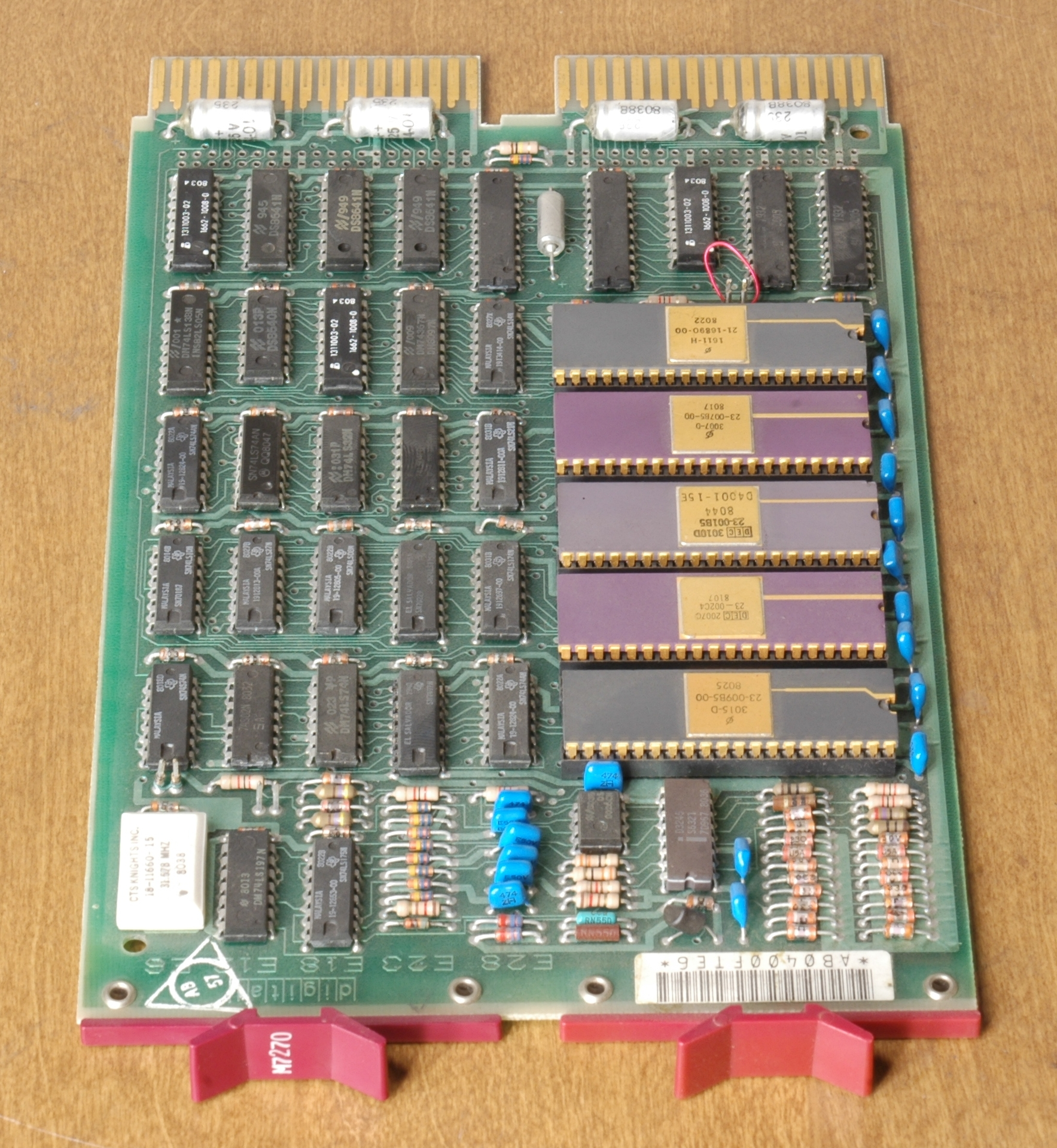
PDP-11 CPU board

Computer hardware, commonly shortened to hardware, includes the physical parts of a computer, such as the central processing unit (CPU), random-access memory (RAM), motherboard, computer data storage, graphics card, sound card, and computer case. It includes external devices such as a monitor, mouse, keyboard, and speakers.

By contrast, software is a set of written instructions that can be stored and run by hardware. Hardware derives its name from the fact that it is hard or rigid with respect to changes, whereas software is soft because it is easy to change.

Hardware is typically directed by the software to execute any command or instruction. A combination of hardware and software forms a usable computing system, although other systems exist with only hardware.

== History ==
Some of the earliest computing devices date back to the seventeenth century. For example, in 1642, French mathematician Blaise Pascal designed a gear-based device called the Pascaline that could add and subtract. Then, in 1676, the stepped reckoner was invented by Gottfried Leibniz, which could also divide and multiply. Due to the limitations of contemporary fabrication and design flaws, Leibniz's reckoner was not very functional, but similar devices (Leibniz wheel) remained in use into the 1970s. In the 19th century, Englishman Charles Babbage invented the difference engine, a mechanical device to calculate polynomials for astronomical purposes. Babbage also designed a general-purpose computer that was never built. Much of the design was incorporated into the earliest computers: punch cards for input and output, memory, an arithmetic unit analogous to central processing units, and even a primitive programming language similar to assembly language.

In 1936, Alan Turing developed the concept of the universal Turing machine to model any type of computer, demonstrating that no machine could solve the decision problem. The universal Turing machine was a type of stored-program computer capable of mimicking the operations of any Turing machine (computer model) based on the software instructions passed to it. The storage of computer programs is key to the operation of modern computers and is the connection between computer hardware and software. Even prior to this, in the mid-19th century mathematician George Boole invented Boolean algebra—a system of logic where each proposition is either true or false. Boolean algebra is now the basis of the circuits that model the transistors and other components of integrated circuits that make up modern computer hardware. In 1945, Turing finished the design for a computer (the Automatic Computing Engine) that was never built.

Von Neumann architecture scheme

Around this time, technological advancement in relays and vacuum tubes enabled the construction of the first computers. Building on Babbage's design, relay computers were built by George Stibitz at Bell Laboratories and Harvard University's Howard Aiken, who engineered the MARK I. Also in 1945, mathematician John von Neumann—working on the ENIAC project at the University of Pennsylvania—devised the underlying von Neumann architecture that has served as the template for most modern computers. Von Neumann's design featured a centralized memory that stored both data and programs, a central processing unit (CPU) with priority of access to the memory, and input and output (I/O) units. Von Neumann used a single bus to transfer data, meaning that his solution to the storage problem by locating programs and data adjacent to each other created the Von Neumann bottleneck when the system tries to fetch both at the same time—often throttling the system's performance.

== Computer architecture ==
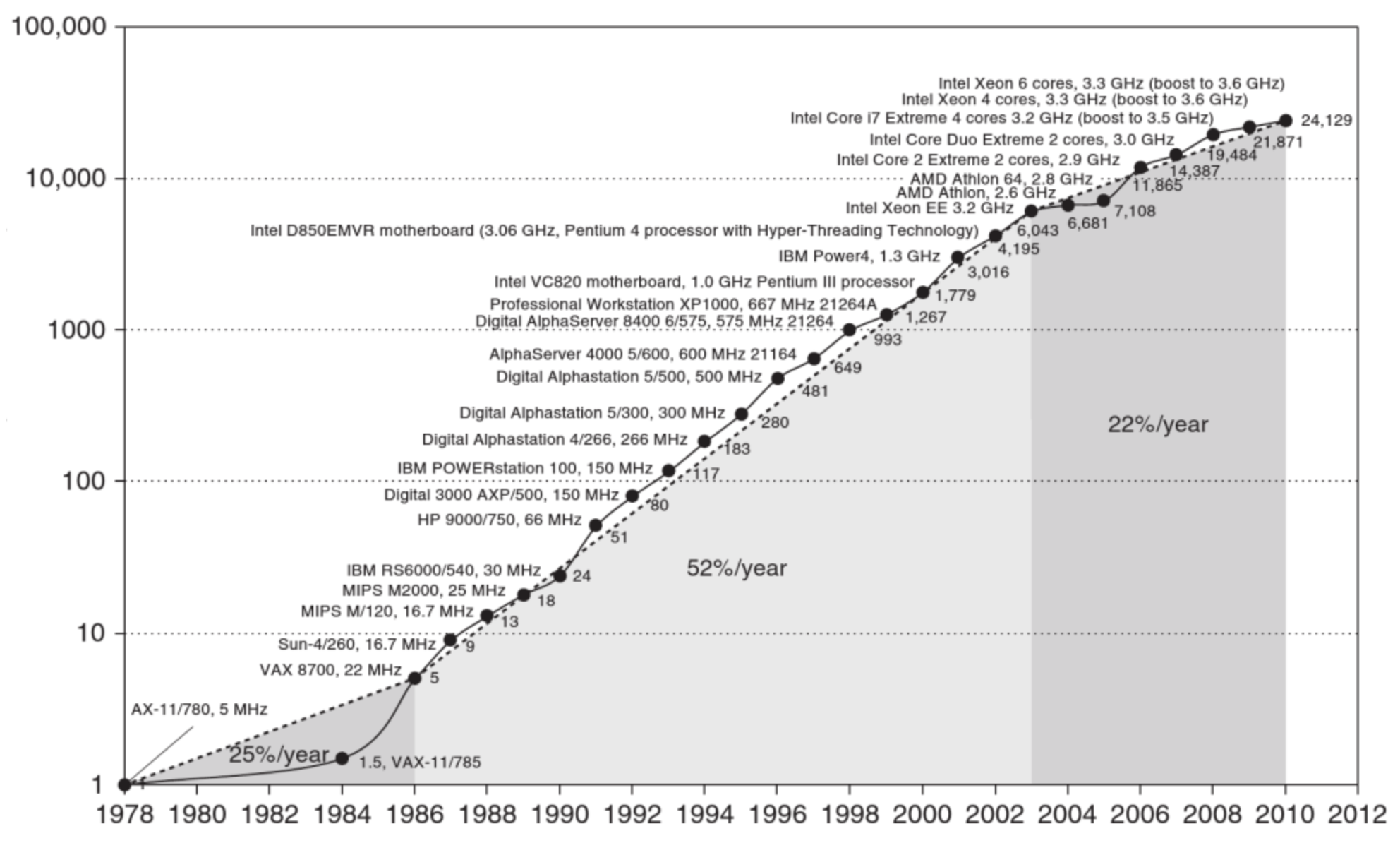
Growth in processor performance (as measured by benchmarks), 1978–2010

Computer architecture involves balancing various goals, such as cost, speed, availability, and energy efficiency. Designers must have a thorough understanding of hardware requirements and diverse aspects of computing, ranging from compilers to Integrated circuit design. Cost has also become a significant constraint for manufacturers seeking to sell their products for less money than competitors offering a very similar hardware component. Profit margins have also been reduced. Even when performance is not increasing, the cost of components has been dropping over time due to improved manufacturing techniques that have fewer components rejected at the quality assurance stage.

=== Instruction set architecture ===
The most common instruction set architecture (ISA)—the interface between a computer's hardware and software—is based on the one devised by von Neumann in 1945. Despite the separation of the computing unit and the I/O system in many architectures, typically the hardware is shared, with a bit in the computing unit indicating whether it is in computation or I/O mode. Common types of ISAs include CISC (complex instruction set computer), RISC (reduced instruction set computer), vector operations, and hybrid modes. CISC involves using a larger instruction set to minimize the number of instructions the machines need to use. Based on the recognition that only a few instructions are commonly used, RISC shrinks the instruction set for added simplicity, which also enables the inclusion of more registers. After the invention of RISC in the 1980s, RISC-based architectures that used pipelining and caching to increase performance displaced CISC architectures, particularly in applications with restrictions on power usage or space (such as mobile phones). From 1986 to 2003, the annual rate of improvement in hardware performance exceeded 50 percent, enabling the development of new computing devices such as tablets and mobiles. Alongside the density of transistors, DRAM memory as well as flash and magnetic disk storage also became exponentially more compact and cheaper. The rate of improvement slackened off in the twenty-first century.

In the twenty-first century, increases in performance have been driven by increasing exploitation of parallelism. Applications are often parallelizable in two ways: either the same function is running across multiple areas of data (data parallelism) or different tasks can be performed simultaneously with limited interaction (task parallelism). These forms of parallelism are accommodated by various hardware strategies, including instruction-level parallelism (such as instruction pipelining), vector architectures and graphical processing units (GPUs) that are able to implement data parallelism, thread-level parallelism and request-level parallelism (both implementing task-level parallelism).

=== Microarchitecture ===
Microarchitecture, also known as computer organization, refers to high-level hardware questions such as the design of the CPU, memory, and memory interconnect. Memory hierarchy ensures that the memory that is quicker to access (and more expensive) is located closer to the CPU, while slower, cheaper memory for large-volume storage is located further away. Memory is typically segregated to separate programs from data and limit an attacker's ability to alter programs. Most computers use virtual memory to simplify addressing for programs, using the operating system to map virtual memory to different areas of the finite physical memory.

=== Cooling ===
Computer processors generate heat, and excessive heat impacts their performance and can harm the components. Many computer chips will automatically throttle their performance to avoid overheating. Computers also typically have mechanisms for dissipating excessive heat, such as air or liquid coolers for the CPU and GPU and heatsinks for other components, such as the RAM. Computer cases are also often ventilated to help dissipate heat from the computer. Data centers typically use more sophisticated cooling solutions to keep the operating temperature of the entire center safe. Air-cooled systems are more common in smaller or older data centers, while liquid-cooled immersion (where each computer is surrounded by cooling fluid) and direct-to-chip (where the cooling fluid is directed to each computer chip) can be more expensive but are also more efficient. Most computers are designed to be more powerful than their cooling system, but their sustained operations cannot exceed the capacity of the cooling system. While performance can be temporarily increased when the computer is not hot (overclocking), in order to protect the hardware from excessive heat, the system will automatically reduce performance or shut down the processor if necessary. Processors will also shut off or enter a low-power mode when inactive to reduce heat. Power delivery as well as heat dissipation are the most challenging aspects of hardware design, and have been the limiting factor to the development of smaller and faster chips since the early twenty-first century. Increases in performance require a commensurate increase in energy use and cooling demand.

== Functions of computer hardware ==
Computer hardware components work together to perform four basic functions: input, processing, storage, and output. Input devices such as keyboards and mice allow users to enter data. The central processing unit (CPU) processes the data, while random-access memory (RAM) temporarily stores information currently in use. Storage devices retain data, and output devices such as monitors and printers present the results to users. The motherboard connects the different hardware components and allows them to communicate with each other.

== Types of computer hardware systems ==
=== Personal computer ===
Basic hardware components of a personal computer, including a monitor, a motherboard, a CPU, a RAM, two expansion cards, a power supply, an optical disc drive, a hard disk drive, a keyboard and a mouse

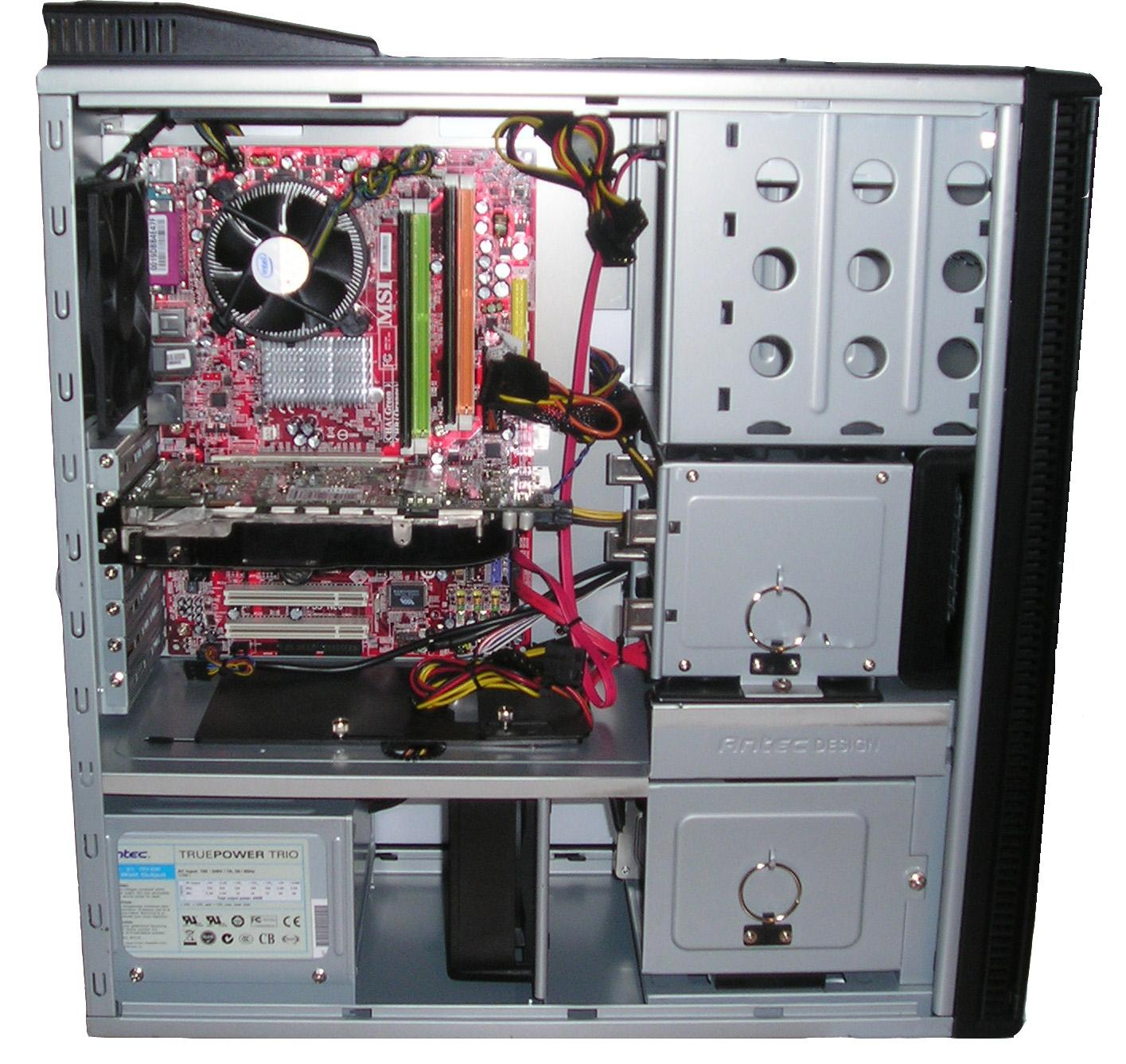
Inside a custom-built computer: power supply at the bottom has its own cooling fan

The personal computer is one of the most common types of computers due to its versatility and relatively low price.

- Desktop personal computers have a monitor, a keyboard, a mouse, and a computer case. The computer case holds the motherboard, fixed or removable disk drives for data storage, the power supply, and may contain other peripheral devices such as modems or network interfaces. Some models of desktop computers integrated the monitor and keyboard into the same case as the processor and power supply. Separating the elements allows the user to arrange the components in a pleasing, comfortable array, at the cost of managing power and data cables between them.
- Laptops are designed for portability but operate similarly to desktop PCs. They may use lower-power or reduced size components, with lower performance than a similarly priced desktop computer. Laptops contain the keyboard, display, and processor in one case. The monitor in the folding upper cover of the case can be closed for transportation to protect the screen and keyboard. Instead of a mouse, laptops may have a touchpad or pointing stick.
- Tablets are portable computers that use a touch screen as the primary input device. Tablets generally weigh less and are smaller than laptops. Some tablets include fold-out keyboards or offer connections to separate external keyboards. Some models of laptop computers have a detachable keyboard, which allows the system to be configured as a touch-screen tablet. They are sometimes called 2-in-1 detachable laptops or tablet-laptop hybrids.
- Mobile phones are designed to have an extended battery life and light weight, while having less functionality than larger computers. They have diverse hardware architecture, often including antennas, microphones, cameras, GPS devices, and speakers. Power and data connections vary between phones.

=== Large-scale computers ===
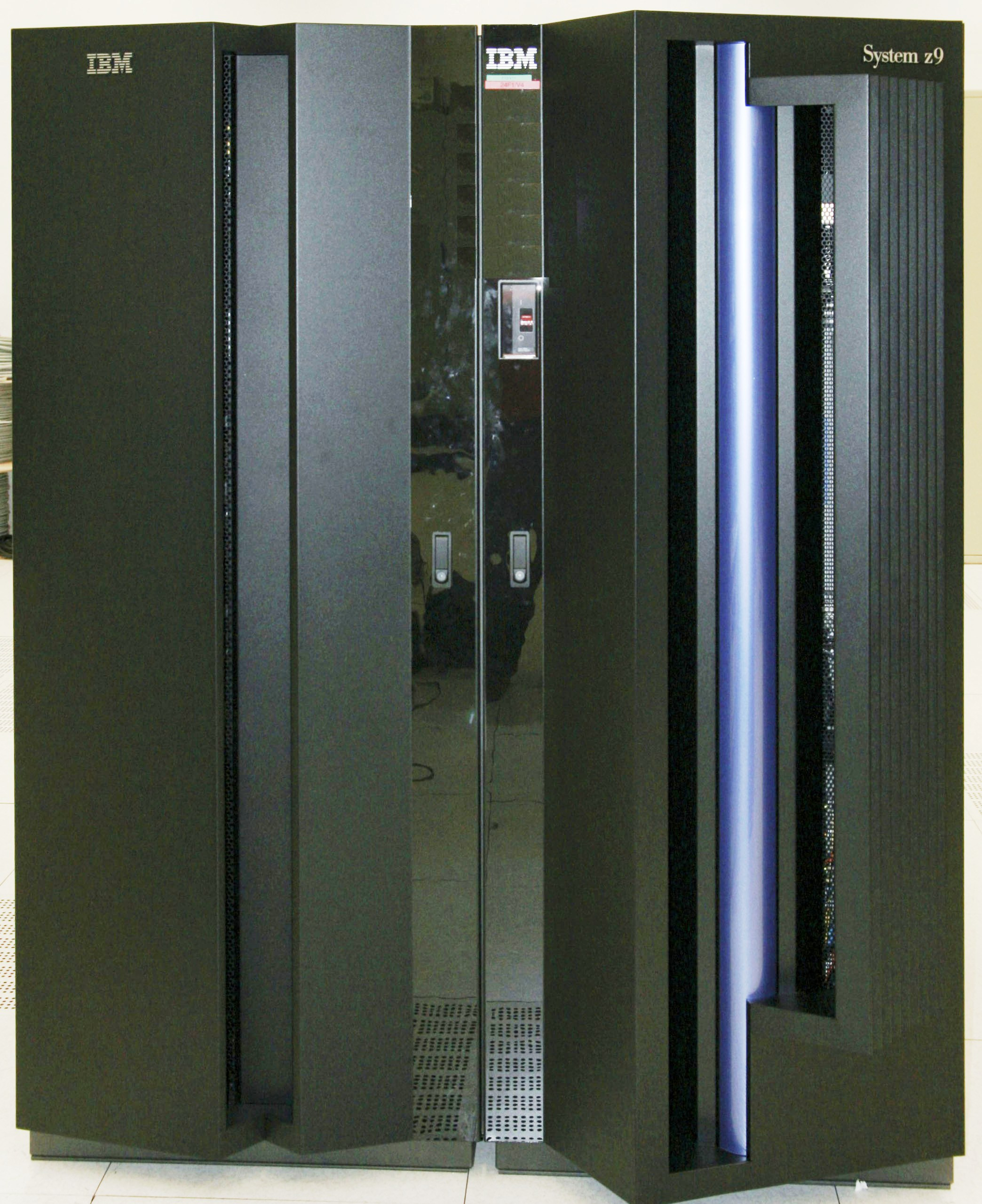
An IBM System z9 mainframe

- A mainframe computer is a much larger computer that typically fills a room and may cost many hundreds or thousands of times as much as a personal computer. They are designed to perform large numbers of calculations for governments and large enterprises.
- In the 1960s and 1970s, more and more departments started to use cheaper and dedicated systems for specific purposes like process control and laboratory automation. A minicomputer, or colloquially mini, is a class of smaller computers that was developed in the mid-1960s and sold for much less than mainframe and mid-size computers from IBM and its direct competitors.
- Supercomputers can cost hundreds of millions of dollars. They are designed to maximize performance in floating-point arithmetic and execute batch programs that may take weeks to complete. Due to the need for efficient communication between parallel programs, the speed of the internal network is a critical priority.
- Warehouse scale computers are larger versions of cluster computers that came into fashion with software as a service provided via the internet. Their design is intended to minimize cost per operation and power usage, as they can cost over $100 million for a warehouse and the computers that go inside (the computers must be replaced every few years). Although availability is crucial for SaaS products, the software is designed to compensate for availability failures—unlike supercomputers.

=== Virtual hardware ===
Virtual hardware is software that mimics the function of hardware; it is commonly used in infrastructure as a Service (IaaS) and platform as a Service (PaaS).

=== Embedded system ===
Embedded systems have the most variation in their processing power and cost: from an 8-bit processor that could cost less than US$0.10, to higher-end processors capable of billions of operations per second and costing over US$100. Cost is a particular concern with these systems, with designers often choosing the cheapest option that satisfies the performance requirements.

== Components ==
=== Case ===
A computer case encloses most of the components of a desktop computer system. It provides mechanical support and protection for internal elements such as the motherboard, disk drives, and power supply, and controls and directs the flow of cooling air over internal components. The case is also part of the system to control electromagnetic interference radiated by the computer and protects internal parts from electrostatic discharge. Large tower cases provide space for multiple disk drives or other peripherals and usually stand on the floor, while desktop cases provide less expansion room. All-in-one style designs include a video display built into the same case. Portable and laptop computers require cases that provide impact protection for the unit. Hobbyists may decorate the cases with colored lights, paint, or other features, in an activity called case modding.

=== Power supply ===
Most personal computer power supply units meet the ATX standard and convert from alternating current (AC) at between 120 and 277 volts provided from a power outlet to direct current (DC) at a much lower voltage: typically 12, 5, or 3.3 volts.

=== Motherboard ===
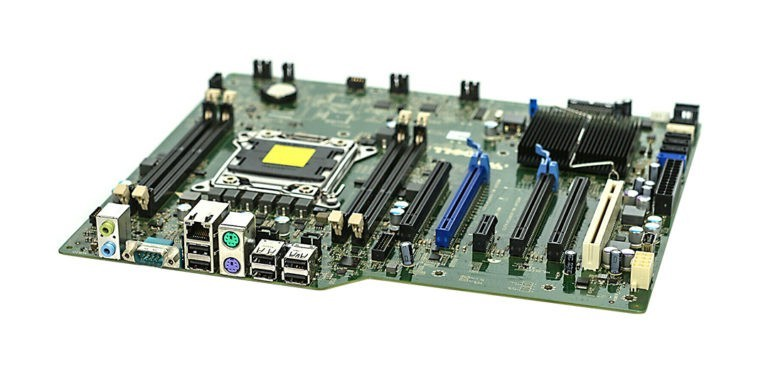
Computer motherboard

The motherboard is the main component of a computer. It is a board with integrated circuitry that connects the other parts of the computer, including the CPU, the RAM, the disk drives (CD, DVD, hard disk, or any others) as well as any peripherals connected via the ports or the expansion slots. The integrated circuit (IC) chips in a computer typically contain billions of tiny metal–oxide–semiconductor field-effect transistors (MOSFETs).

Components directly attached to or to part of the motherboard include:

- At least one CPU (central processing unit), which performs the majority of computational tasks required for a computer to operate. Often described informally as the brain of the computer, the CPU fetches program instructions from random-access memory (RAM), decodes and executes them, then returns results for further processing by other components. This process is known as the instruction cycle. Modern CPUs are microprocessors fabricated on a metal–oxide–semiconductor (MOS) integrated circuit (IC) using advanced semiconductor device fabrication techniques, often employing photolithography. They are typically cooled using a heatsink and fan or a liquid-cooling system. Many contemporary CPUs integrate an on-die graphics processing unit (GPU), eliminating the need for a discrete GPU in basic systems. CPU performance is influenced by clock speed—measured in gigahertz (GHz)—with common consumer processors ranging from 1 GHz to 5 GHz. Additionally, there is a growing trend toward multi-core designs, where multiple processing cores are included on a single chip, enabling greater parallelism and improved multitasking performance.
- The internal bus connects the CPU to main memory via multiple communication lines—typically 50 to 100—divided into address, data, and control buses, each handling specific types of signals. Historically, parallel buses were dominant, but in the twenty-first century, high-speed serial buses (often using serializer/deserializer (SerDes) technology) have largely replaced them, enabling greater data throughput over fewer physical connections. Examples include PCI Express and USB. In systems with multiple processors, an interconnect bus is used, traditionally coordinated by a northbridge chip, which links the CPU, memory, and high-speed peripherals such as PCI. The southbridge handles communication with slower I/O devices such as storage and USB ports. However, in modern architectures like Intel QuickPath Interconnect or AMD Ryzen-based systems, these functions are increasingly integrated into the CPU itself, forming a system on a chip (SoC)-like design.
- Random-access memory (RAM) stores code and data actively used by the CPU, organized in a memory hierarchy optimized for access speed and predicted reuse. At the top of this hierarchy are registers, located within the CPU core, offering the fastest access but extremely limited capacity. Below registers are multiple levels of cache memory—L1, L2, and sometimes L3—typically implemented using static random-access memory (SRAM). Caches have greater capacity than registers but less than main memory, and while slower than registers, they are significantly faster than dynamic random-access memory (DRAM), which is used for main RAM. Caching improves performance by prefetching frequently used data, thereby reducing memory latency. When data is not found in the cache (a cache miss), it is retrieved from main memory. RAM is volatile, meaning its contents are lost when the system loses power. In modern systems, DRAM is often of the DDR SDRAM type, such as DDR4 or DDR5.
- Permanent storage or non-volatile memory is typically higher capacity and cheaper than memory, but takes much longer to access. Historically, such storage was typically provided in the form of a hard drive, but solid-state drives (SSD) are becoming cheaper and are much faster, thus leading to their increasing adoption. USB drives and network or cloud storage are also options.
- Read-only memory (ROM) contains firmware such as the BIOS (Basic Input/Output System), which initializes hardware during the boot process—known as booting or bootstrapping—when the computer is powered on. This firmware is stored in a non-volatile memory chip, traditionally ROM or flash memory, allowing updates in modern systems via firmware update.
  - The BIOS manages essential functions, including boot sequence and power management through the ACPI standard. However, most modern motherboards have transitioned to the Unified Extensible Firmware Interface (UEFI), which offers enhanced capabilities, faster startup times, support for GUID Partition Table (GPT), and secure boot features.
- The CMOS (complementary MOS) battery, which powers the CMOS memory for date and time in the BIOS chip. This battery is generally a watch battery.
- Power MOSFETs make up the voltage regulator module (VRM), which controls how much voltage other hardware components receive.

=== Expansion cards ===
An expansion card in computing is a printed circuit board that can be inserted into an expansion slot of a computer motherboard or backplane to add functionality to a computer system via the expansion bus. Expansion cards can be used to obtain or expand on features not offered by the motherboard. Using expansion cards for a video processor used to be common, but modern computers are more likely to instead have a GPU integrated into the motherboard.

=== Input/output ===
Most computers also have an external data bus to connect peripheral devices to the motherboard. Most commonly, Universal Serial Bus (USB) is used. Unlike the internal bus, the external bus is connected using a bus controller that allows the peripheral system to operate at a different speed from the CPU. Input and output devices are used to receive data from the external world or write data, respectively. Common examples include keyboards and mice (input) and displays and printers (output). Network interface controllers are used to access the Internet. USB ports also allow power to connected devices—a standard USB supplies power at 5 volts and up to 500 milliamps (2.5 watts), while powered USB ports with additional pins may allow the delivery of more power—up to 6 amps at 24v.

== Sales ==
Global revenue from computer hardware in 2023 reached $705.17 billion.

Global revenue from computer hardware in 2026 is projected to reach $779.34 billion, up from $705.17 billion in 2023.

== Recycling ==
Because computer parts contain hazardous materials, there is a growing movement to recycle old and outdated devices. Computer hardware contains hazardous substances such as lead, mercury, nickel, and cadmium. According to the EPA, these e-wastes negatively affect the environment if not disposed of properly. Hardware manufacturing also requires significant energy, while recycling components helps reduce air and water pollution as well as greenhouse gas emissions. In many regions, improper disposal of computer equipment is illegal, and legislation requires recycling through government-approved facilities. Recycling can be facilitated by removing reusable parts such as RAM, DVD drives, graphics cards, hard drives, SSDs, and other similar components.

Many materials used in computer hardware can be recovered through recycling for use in future production. The reuse of tin, silicon, iron, aluminum, and various plastics commonly found in computers and other electronics helps reduce the costs of manufacturing new systems. Hardware components also frequently contain copper, gold, tantalum, silver, platinum, palladium, and lead, along with other valuable materials suitable for reclamation.

=== Toxic computer components ===
The central processing unit contains several toxic materials. It may include lead and chromium in metal plates. Resistors, semiconductors, infrared detectors, stabilizers, cables, and wires can contain cadmium, while computer circuit boards may also contain mercury and chromium. Improper disposal of these materials and chemicals can pose serious hazards to the environment.

=== Environmental effects ===
When e-waste byproducts leach into groundwater, are burned, or are mishandled during recycling, it causes harm. Health problems associated with such toxins include impaired mental development, cancer, and damage to the lungs, liver, and kidneys. Computer components contain many toxic substances, like dioxins, polychlorinated biphenyls (PCBs), cadmium, chromium, radioactive isotopes and mercury. Circuit boards contain considerable quantities of lead-tin solders that are more likely to leach into groundwater or create air pollution due to incineration.

Recycling of computer hardware is considered environmentally friendly because it prevents hazardous waste, including heavy metals and carcinogens, from entering the atmosphere, landfill or waterways. While electronics account for a small fraction of total waste generated, they are far more dangerous. There is stringent legislation designed to enforce and encourage the sustainable disposal of appliances, the most notable being the Waste Electrical and Electronic Equipment Directive of the European Union and the United States National Computer Recycling Act.

=== Efforts for minimizing computer hardware waste ===
E-cycling, the recycling of computer hardware, refers to the donation, reuse, shredding and general collection of used electronics. Generically, the term refers to the process of collecting, brokering, disassembling, repairing and recycling the components or metals contained in used or discarded electronic equipment, otherwise known as electronic waste (e-waste). E-cyclable items include, but are not limited to: televisions, computers, microwave ovens, vacuum cleaners, telephones and cellular phones, stereos, and VCRs and DVDs just about anything that has a cord, light or takes some kind of battery.

Some companies, such as Dell and Apple, will recycle computers of their own make or any other make. Otherwise, a computer can be donated to Computer Aid International which is an organization that recycles and refurbishes old computers for hospitals, schools, universities, etc.

== See also ==
- Computer architecture
- Electronic hardware
- Hardware for artificial intelligence
- Glossary of computer hardware terms
- History of computing hardware
- Microprocessor
- MOSFET
- List of computer hardware manufacturers
- Open-source computing hardware
- Open-source hardware
- Transistor

== Sources ==
- Blum, Edward K. (2011). Computer Science: The Hardware, Software and Heart of It. Springer Science & Business Media. ISBN 978-1-4614-1168-0.
- Hennessy, John L.; Patterson, David A. (2011). Computer Architecture: A Quantitative Approach. Elsevier. ISBN 978-0-12-383872-8.
- Mendelson, Avi (2022). "The Architecture". In Anupam Chattopadhyay (ed.). Handbook of Computer Architecture. Springer Nature. pp. 1–42. doi:10.1007/978-981-15-6401-7_1-1. ISBN 978-981-15-6401-7.
- Wang, Shuangbao Paul (2021). Computer Architecture and Organization: Fundamentals and Architecture Security. Springer Nature. ISBN 978-981-16-5662-0.
