= NetDay =

Former event promoting internet connection

NetDay (1995–2004) was an event established in 1995 that "called on high-tech companies to commit resources to schools, libraries, and clinics worldwide so that they could connect to the Internet". It was developed by John Gage (then-chief science officer at Sun Microsystems) and activist Michael Kaufman. They approached Delaine Eastin, California's State Superintendent of Public Instruction, to put together the first event in California. The first official NetDay was held in 1996.

In 2005, NetDay merged with Project Tomorrow (tomorrow.org), a California nonprofit involved with math and science education. The organization is continuing to work with schools to improve the use of technology in education.

== Overview ==
NetDay was established to take place over the course of one Saturday, whereby designated schools would receive full connection to the Internet. Activities were coordinated at the website netday.org. The HTML Writers Guild (quoting the NetDay FAQ) defined the day as an:

historic grassroots effort in the classic American barn-raising tradition. Using volunteer labor, our goal is to install all the basic wiring needed to make five classrooms and a library or a computer lab in every school Internet-ready. If the same work were financed by taxpayers, it would cost more than $1,000 per classroom. Volunteers from businesses, education, and the community will acquire all of the equipment and will install and test it at every school site. Your support and participation is crucial to our success. In addition, by bringing together these diverse elements, NetDay establishes a framework for lasting partnerships among business, government, educational institutions, and local communities to provide ongoing support for our schools.

Some argued that access to the Internet should not be a priority when schools lack even basic resources like library books (although in many cases the project added needed materials and efforts to computing projects already underway).

== NetDay '96 ==
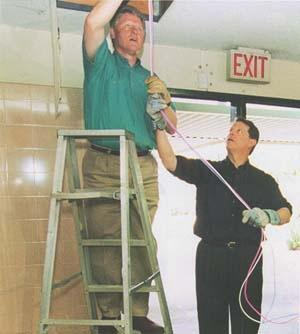
US president Bill Clinton installing computer cables with Vice President Al Gore on NetDay 1996 at Ygnacio Valley High School in Concord, CA.

The first NetDay was held on March 9, 1996. NetDay '96 created considerable excitement amongst participating schools. The day was organized via the website netday96.com. 20,000 volunteers helped to wire 20 percent of California schools to the Internet. 2,500 wiring kits were donated by telephone companies. Of the first event, Gage commented, "NetDay96 is a demonstration of what can happen when people coalesce around a community project [...] In one day, we can begin to reverse California's abysmal record of putting technology into its classrooms."

President Bill Clinton and Vice President Al Gore led the NetDay '96 effort in California, spending the day at Ygnacio Valley High School. The event was augmented by sending Education Secretary Richard Riley, Commerce Secretary Ron Brown, and FCC Chairman Reed Hundt to schools in the San Diego, Sacramento, and Los Angeles school districts, and establishing a multicast bridge for live video conferencing. The original plan to host Clinton and Gore in the Oakland Unified School District was changed at the last minute due to a teachers strike.

In his speech at YVH, Clinton stated that he was excited to see that his challenge the previous September to "Californians to connect at least 20 percent of your schools to the Information Superhighway by the end of this school year" was met. Clinton also described this event as part of a time of "absolutely astonishing transformation; a moment of great possibility. All of you know that the information and technology explosion will offer to you and to the young people of the future more opportunities and challenges than any generation of Americans has ever seen". Clinton acknowledged the support of the State Superintendent of Public Instruction Delaine Eastin, Lieutenant Governor Gray Davis, Senator Barbara Boxer and Representative George Miller.

In a prepared statement, Gore added that NetDay was part of one of the major goals of the Clinton administration, which was "to give every child in America access to high quality educational technology by the dawn of the new century." Gore also stated that the administration planned "to connect every classroom to the Internet by the year 2000".

Another NetDay was held that same year in October in Silicon Valley, involving 80 companies and approximately 3,500 volunteers helping to network 172 schools. The campaign was called Smart Schools NetDay II and was coordinated by Smart Valley, Inc., a 501(c)(4) nonprofit organization, part of the initiatives at Joint Venture: Silicon Valley.

== NetDay activities ==
On April 28, 1998, Gore honored numerous volunteers who had been involved with NetDay and "who helped connect students to the Internet in 700 of the poorest schools in the country" via "an interactive online session with children across the country." Volunteers continued to play a central role in NetDay school wiring activities, and by the end of 2001, NetDay events were held in 40 states and engaged more than 500,000 volunteers to wire more than 75,000 classrooms across the USA. Archived versions of the NetDay Web site, netday.org, say that NetDay events were planned for March 20, 1999, April 8, 2000, October 28, 2000, March 31, 2001 and October 27, 2001.

In its last four years of operation, NetDay changed its focus from one or two days a year to wire schools to the Internet. Its new events and activities included collaborating with Join Hands Day in 2002, and three new initiatives: NetDay TechDay, NetDay Speakup Day and TESS ― Technology Enhancing Student Success.

In February 2006, NetDay merged with Project Tomorrow, a national education nonprofit organization.

== See also ==
- eCorps
- Geekcorps
- Geeks Without Bounds
- ICVolunteers
- Inveneo
- NetCorps
- One Laptop per Child
- Peace Corps
- Random Hacks of Kindness
- TechSoup
- United Nations Information Technology Service (UNITeS)
