= Ygnacio Valley High School =

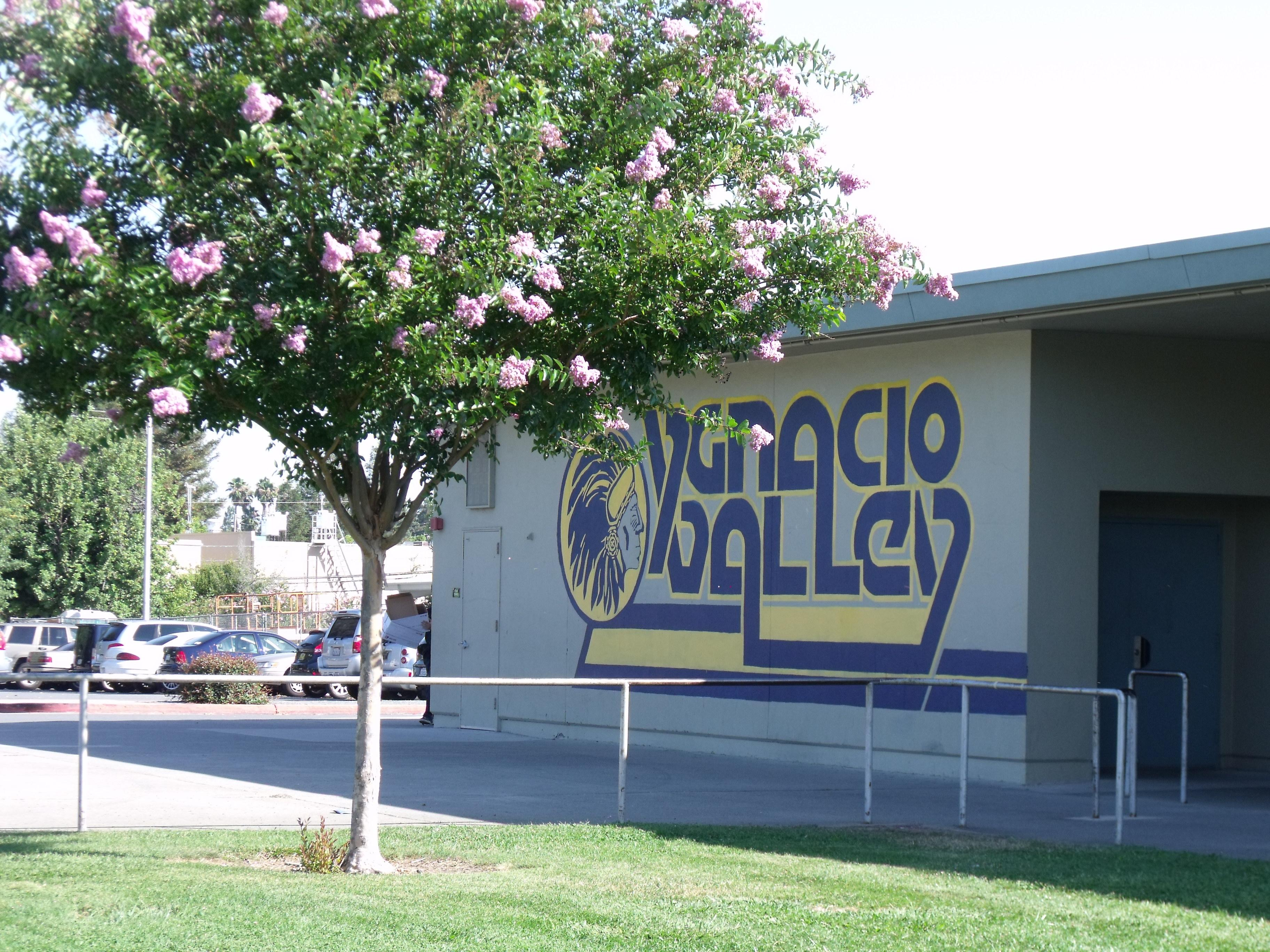
- A mural with the school mascot at the front entrance of the school

Location
- 755 Oak Grove Road; Concord, California 94518; United States; 37.933993°N 122.025898°W

Information
- Type: Public high school
- Motto: "Students first, learning always!"
- Established: 1960
- School district: Mount Diablo Unified School District
- Superintendent: Adam Clark
- Principal: Peter Crutchfield
- Staff: 55.84 (FTE)
- Grades: 9–12
- Enrollment: 1,059 (2024-2025)
- Student to teacher ratio: 18.96
- Colors: Navy and Gold
- Mascot: Wolf
- Nickname: Wolves
- Website: yvhs.mdusd.org

Ygnacio Valley High School (YVHS) is a public secondary school located in Concord, California, United States. It draws students from Concord as well as from the neighboring communities of Walnut Creek and Pleasant Hill. The school opened in 1962, and its first senior class graduated in 1964. Originally conceived as a temporary facility, the school currently carries an enrollment of over 1,500 total students for grades 9 through 12. When the nearby Northgate High School opened in 1974, YVHS lost approximately half its student body at the time. The school is part of the Mount Diablo Unified School District.

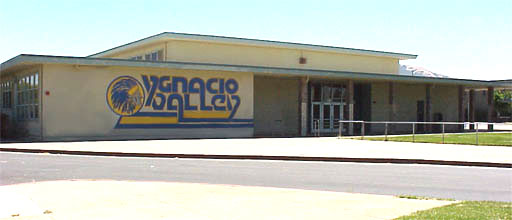
YVHS Multi-Use

== Academics ==
Ygnacio Valley High School has been an IB World School since March 22, 2017. This school is the only school within the Mount Diablo Unified School District to offer the International Baccalaureate program. Some subjects offered are Spanish B, Mathematics, and History.

== Famous visits ==
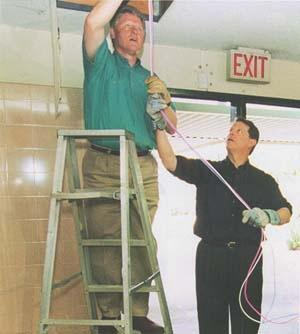
President Bill Clinton installing computer cables with Vice President Al Gore on NetDay at Ygnacio Valley High School, March 9, 1996

During the 1988 presidential campaign, then Vice President George Bush made an appearance at YVHS and addressed the student body. In 1996, YVHS received another presidential visit when Bill Clinton and Vice President Al Gore made a rare joint appearance. They visited the campus as part of the NetDay '96 event, which kicked off a drive to connect California public schools to the Internet.

YVHS is an ideal location for such high-security visits, due to the limited entry points into school property.

In the early 1990s, YVHS also received visits from U.S. Representatives George Miller and Bill Baker, sponsored by the school's now-defunct Public Policy Society.

== Ongoing issues ==
The school mascot, the Warrior, is represented as a Native American spear going through the letter ‘W’ (for Warriors). Similar mascots representing Native American culture are often a point of contention throughout the state of California, where over 100 high schools have American Indian mascots.

YVHS is occasionally cited in the ongoing school prayer debate, after allowing Muslim students to use an available room for prayer during Ramadan in 2004.

== Notable alumni ==
- Mike Bellotti - University of Oregon athletic director
- Lance Blankenship - baseball player
- Ian Brennan (music producer, author) - music producer and author
- Matt Chesse - film editor
- Jonathan Dayton - director of films and music videos
- D.C. Douglas - Actor and voice over artist.
- Kiko Garcia - baseball player
- Kristin Heaston - shot put athlete
- Glenn Helzer - convicted murderer and former cult leader
- Damian Jackson - baseball player
- Carl Ryanen-Grant - received widespread attention for his cancer battle with while at university
- Dave Tollefson - football player
- Chris Walsh - football player
- Dave Zawatson, football player.
