= Linda Germanis =

Italian officials of the United Nations and Yogi

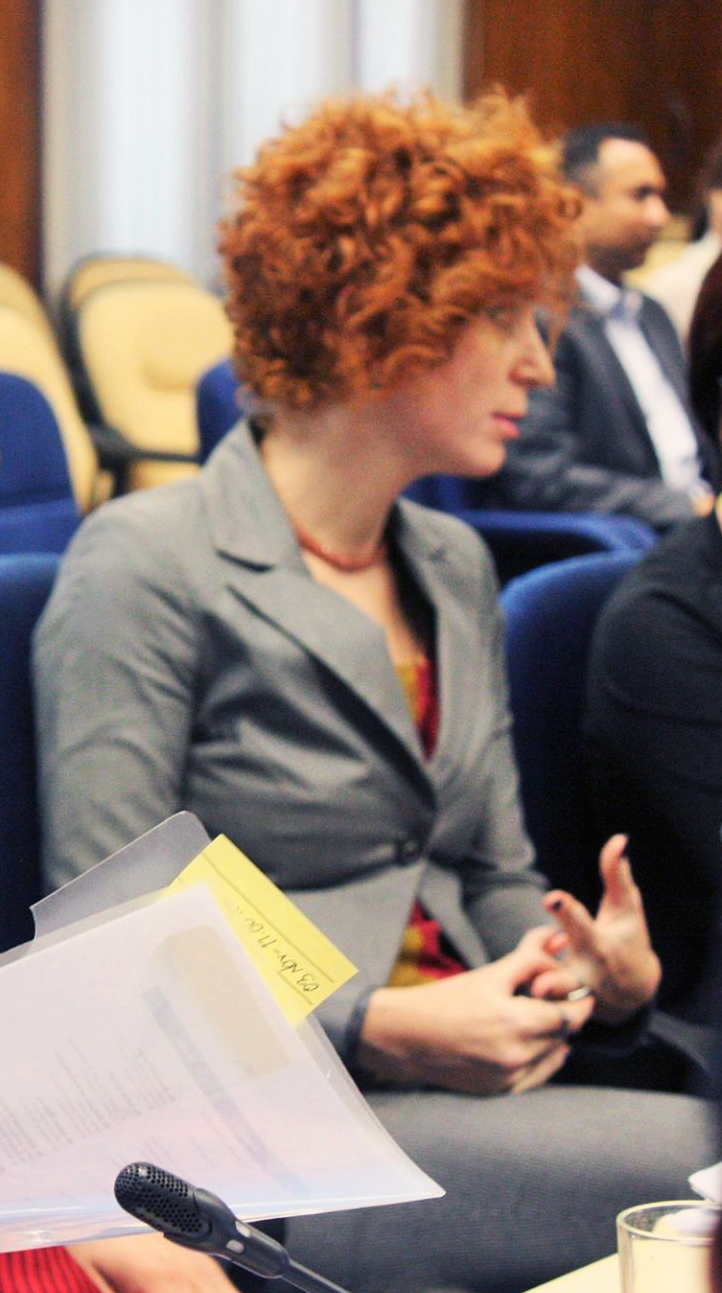
Linda Garmanis, at "UNDAF Signing Ceremony".

Linda Germanis is an Italian international United Nations Volunteer, economist and an author. She is a certified yoga teacher, founder of YOGA FUSION and current head of the United Nations Volunteers (UNV) Programme in Bangladesh.

== Contribution ==
From 2009 to 2010, she was a Consultant at UNESCO Bangkok and Project coordinator at UNV Thailand . From August 2011 to December 2013, she was a Development Economist at UNV/UNDP (Micronesia). From 2014 she is the Head (Programme Ofiicer) of the UNV Bangladesh . It's a program that advocates for volunteerism and social cohesion as a common good creating social justice starting from individual choices.

In February 2013, she founded Yap Fusion; a innovative food security NGO. It was included as a good practice at UNV Fiji .

In March 2014, she founded Yoga Fusion. It's a Research and pilot project on yoga for post-conflict reconciliation and reintegration processes. It's developed under the advisory role of the International Institute of Social Studies (The Netherlands), and the Patanjali Research Foundation (India).

On 1 June 2014, her text was published by Cambridge Scholars Publishing . On 27 March 2015; she published a yoga training book .

== Awards ==
In 2009, she was awarded "the Outstanding Volunteer Award 2009" by the Thai Ministry of Social Development and Human Security for her photography project . The award was presented by the National Commission on Social Welfare, the Ministry of Social Development and Human Security, and the National Council on Social Welfare of Thailand under Royal Patronage.

This project won ICV Photo Contest 2009 & three photo were exhibited in Geneva . This project wins 2nd prize at UNV IVD competition . It was also included in the UNV Global Report 2009.

== Work ==
- Cultivating Peace: Contexts, Practices and Multidimensional Models, ISBN 978-1-4438-5693-5
- Heals over Head: Yoga & Yap healed Me. Who heals War? ASIN B00VB50G7K
