= Erik Rasmussen =

Erik Rasmussen may refer to:

- Erik N. Rasmussen (born 1957), American atmospheric scientist and tornado expert
- Erik Rasmussen (ice hockey) (born 1977), ice hockey player
- Erik Rasmussen (footballer) (born 1960), former Danish football player and manager
- Erik Veje Rasmussen (born 1959), former Danish handball player

== See also ==
- Eric Rasmussen (disambiguation)
