= Global e-Schools and Communities Initiative =

International non-profit organisation

The Global e-Schools and Communities Initiative is an international not-for-profit organisation providing demand-driven assistance to developing countries seeking to harness the potential of Information and Communication Technologies (ICT) to improve their education systems.

== Background ==
GeSCI was established in 2003, borne out of the work of the United Nations Information and Communication Technologies Task Force which identified education as an area in critical need of development, and one where ICT has the potential to make positive impacts. The UN ICT Task Force approved a proposal for a UN-affiliated organisation to provide demand-driven assistance to developing countries seeking to harness the potential of ICT to improve the quality of teaching and learning in primary and secondary education. Until 2009, GESCI had its Headquarters in Dublin, Ireland. It was them moved to Kenya and now GESCI is registered under section 10 of the Non-Gevernmental Organizations Co-ordination Act of Kenya. Registration number 218/051/2007/0102/4537. Over the years, GESCI has received support from Irish Aid, Swedish International Development Cooperation Agency (Sida), Swiss Agency for Development and Cooperation (SDC), the Ministry for Foreign Affairs of Finland and Mastercard Foundation, Canada.

== Building a knowledge society for all ==
Education is considered one of the cornerstones of social economic development. Research has shown that education contributes to poverty reduction and increased economic growth, which in turn leads to an increase in the individual's standard of living; enables the individual to participate in wealth generating activities, leads to the creation of employment and the overall development of society. However, the traditional role of education to promote socio-economic development is being re-examined as greater emphasis is placed on access to education, quality and outcomes of the education system.

The education sector is seen as the natural source for the creation of technological literacy and the development of new technological skills as well as other skills that are needed in the new millennium, like problem solving skills, collaboration skills, critical reading and information retrieval, etc. For new technologies like ICT, the creation of these new skills has meant the introduction of ICT into educational institutions and the introduction of computer literacy or media literacy courses as well as new teaching and learning methods.

The relationship between ICT, education and development in a knowledge economy is increasingly being captured by developing country governments through their poverty reduction strategies

Much of GESCI's work is with Government Ministries and their related agencies responsible for education, science & technology, innovation, and vocational training.

GESCI provides technical and strategic advice in developing and implement national strategies and plans to advance their overall education and development objectives in support of developing inclusive knowledge societies.

GESCI has built working relationships with Government ministries and their respective implementation organisations across more than 16 African countries and also with key international organisations.

The Africa-wide Alumni Network for policy-makers in Knowledge Society development has been launched to support the Sustainable Development Goals (SDGs). This network comprises more than 500 alumni (with Graduate Diplomas from Dublin City University) who have participated in the African Leadership in ICT and Knowledge Society Development programme. 74 mid-to-senior level governments officials in Kenya graduated from this leadership programme.
