= Inveneo =

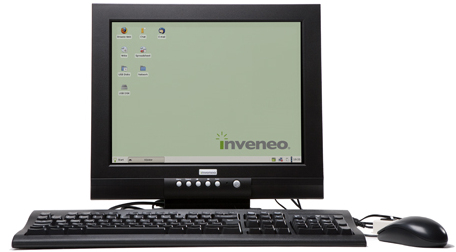
Inveneo Computing Station

Inveneo is a 501(c)(3) non-profit organization based in San Francisco with focus on Information and Communication Technologies for organizations supporting underserved communities in the developing world, mostly in Africa. The organization has developed an ultra low-powered computer, called the Inveneo Computing Station, as well as a VoIP-enabled unit called the Inveneo Communication Station, and a hub server, all of which are designed to run on a 12-volt power supply. The Inveneo Computing and Communication Stations were originally based on a reference design ION A603 mini PC by First International Computer and run AMD Geode CPU.

In addition to ultra low-power computers and servers, Inveneo has also created long-distance wireless (WiFi) Local-Area Networking (LAN) gear and its own open-source operating systems for its desktop and server products (based on Ubuntu). The organization focuses on finding, training, and certifying local partners who can install, service, and support the rural installations quickly and at a much lower cost than flying in Inveneo engineers. Inveneo also helped to set up a communication system for relief workers after Hurricane Katrina. Jamais Cascio, a co-founder of WorldChanging, featured Inveneo in July 2005.

== See also ==
- eCorps
- Geekcorps
- Geeks Without Bounds
- NetDay
- One Laptop per Child
- Peace Corps
- Random Hacks of Kindness
- United Nations Information Technology Service (UNITeS)
