= NetCorps =

Canadian non-governmental organization coalition

NetCorps (French: Cyberjeunes) was a volunteer-organizing coalition from 1997-2009 consisting of nine Canadian non-governmental organizations (NGOs), funded by the Canadian International Development Agency (CIDA) and managed by the NetCorps coordination unit. Through the program, the organizations created international information and communication technologies (ICT) internships in developing countries around the world. Interns typically participated in six-month programs, leaving between August and November for host organizations in the placement countries. Positions were limited to 19–30-year-old Canadian citizens or landed immigrants who had "appropriate information and communication technologies skills". Typical duties included creating webpages, developing databases, computer networking, setting up hardware, preparing manuals and other documentation, and general-to-advanced computer instruction.

The program was discontinued indefinitely after 2009.

== Program ==
=== Objectives ===
- To strengthen the ICT capacity of civil society and public-sector organizations to contribute to development goals in governance, education, health, gender equality and environmental sustainability
- Increase the professional skills and capacities of young Canadians aged 19 to 30 to contribute positively to Canadian international development efforts and secure meaningful employment
- To increase the awareness and promote greater engagement of young Canadians with respect to international development issues

=== Budget ===
During the 2007-2008 season, the program placed 240 interns and was funded by the Canadian International Development Agency (CIDA) and Human Resources and Social Development Canada (HRSDC) at a cost of C$4.6 million. The program covered all travel and accommodation expenses for the interns, provided a modest living allowance and a completion bonus.

== History ==
=== NetCorps creation ===
NetCorps Canada International was conceived in 1996 by Dr. David Johnston (Governor General of Canada as of 2011 and former President of the University of Waterloo), a prominent lawyer and adviser to the federal government on information-highway issues.

=== Phase I ===
In 1997 Industry Canada, in partnership with the Special Initiatives Division of Canada's International Development Research Centre (IDRC), funded a NetCorps-style test project that sent two residents of Cape Breton to Angola for Internet and Geographic Information Systems projects. This NetCorps conceptualization and placement was done through the Centre for Community and Enterprise Networking (C/CEN) and Dr.Michael Gurstein, Director of the Centre and (at the time) Chair in the Management of Technology Change at the University College of Cape Breton. An initial NetCorps training program and manual were produced as a result of this program. Notably, the two placements in Angola were of previously unemployed young adults from Cape Breton; they were provided with training in Linux through C/CEN as part of a demonstration program in the economic benefits that could be achieved through local investment in Information and Communications Technologies in economically marginal regions.

=== Phase II ===
In 1998 the efforts of Industry Canada, the Canadian International Development Agency (CIDA) and a consortium of Canada’s largest international development volunteer-sending agencies secured 14 internships in Africa, Asia and Latin America.

=== Phase III ===
Further collaboration with Industry Canada and the consortium of international development agencies in 1998 saw the Canadian International Development Agency offer 30 internships in the Americas. This phase was announced by the Prime Minister at the 2nd Summit of the Americas in Santiago, Chile in April 1998.

=== Phase IV - NetCorps Canada International ===
From 1999 to 2006, the NetCorps consortium sent more than 1700 NetCorps volunteers overseas, due to the collaboration of Industry Canada and the Youth Employment Strategy financed by Human Resources and Skills Development Canada (HRSDC).

=== 2006–2007 – Transition Year ===
In 2006–2007, the consortium successfully organized the placement of 236 volunteers in collaboration with Industry Canada and the Canadian International Development Agency (CIDA). 2006-2007 was the last year that Industry Canada would be involved in the NetCorps program.

=== Phase VI – 2007–2008 ===
For 2007–2008, (CIDA) replaced Industry Canada as funders of the NetCorps program. The 240 placements offered that year were once again part of the Government of Canada’s youth-employment strategy.

The program was discontinued indefinitely as of the 2008–2009 season.

== Member organizations ==
- WUSC
- Canada World Youth
- Alternatives
- CUSO
- Oxfam Québec
- VSO International
- Canadian Crossroads International
- Canadian Society for International Health
- International Institute for Sustainable Development
- Human Rights Internet

== See also ==
- eCorps
- Geekcorps
- Geeks Without Bounds
- ICVolunteers
- Inveneo
- NetDay
- One Laptop per Child
- Peace Corps
- Random Hacks of Kindness
- United Nations Information Technology Service (UNITeS)
