= Palm Springs High School =

Public high school in California, United States

Coordinates: 33°48′59″N 116°31′14″W

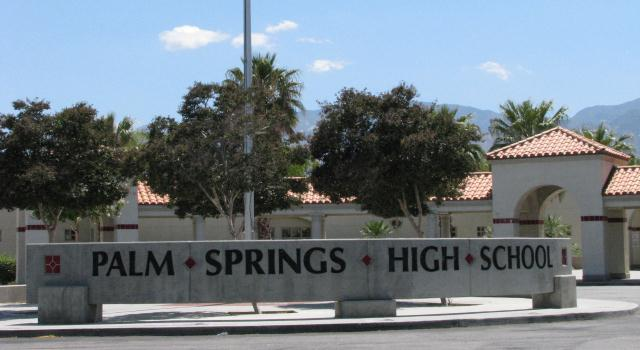
- 2401 E. Baristo Rd. Palm Springs, CA 92262-1766; United States

Information
- Type: Public
- Established: 1938 Circa.
- Principal: Michael Ventura
- Teaching staff: 70.12 (FTE)
- Enrollment: 1,508 (2023-2024)
- Student to teacher ratio: 21.51
- Colors: Red, white and black
- Nickname: Indians
- Rival: Cathedral City High School
- Website: pshs.psusd.us

Palm Springs High School is a public high school for grades 9 through 12 located in Palm Springs, California as part of the Palm Springs Unified School District. It was built in 1938 in an effort led by city pioneer Nellie Coffman.

== Athletics ==
Palm Springs High School was in the Desert Valley League until 2018 when a restructuring saw the creation of the Desert Empire League. The second league was introduced to improve competitive balance, and Palm Springs competes in the Desert Empire League alongside five other teams.

Palm Springs High School football won its first California Interscholastic Federation (CIF) championship in the fall of 2009.

== Notable alumni ==
- Catharine Baker - California State Assemblymember representing California's 16th Assembly District
- Robert Hertzberg – Speaker, California State Assembly
- Gale Anne Hurd - film and television producer
- Alex Hyde-White – actor
- Alejandro Mendoza – democratic socialist politician from Texas
- Eric Rasmussen - physician, TED Prize CEO
- York Shackleton – snowboarder and actor
- Robin Shou – actor and martial artist
- Anthony Claggett - former Major League Baseball player
- Tony Perezchica - former Major League Baseball player
