= Geeks Without Bounds =

Humanitarian organization

- Formation: October 10, 2010; 16 years ago
- Founder: Johnny "Diggz" Higgins, Willow Brugh
- Legal status: Active
- Purpose: Education, Humanitarian aid
- Location: Seattle, Washington
- President: Mark Smythe
- Executive Director: Elisheva Sterling
- Parent organization: Mentor House
- Affiliations: Random Hacks of Kindness
- Website: gwob.org

Geeks Without Bounds (informally known as GWOB) is a humanitarian organization of technologists, first responders, policymakers, and volunteers that work towards improving access to communication and technology. With a focus on working with communities that have limited infrastructure due to violence, negligence, or catastrophe, they organize hackathons for humanitarian technology, and help prototype projects intended to turn into long-term initiatives through their Accelerator for Humanitarian Projects.

== Origins ==
Geeks Without Bounds was initially announced on August 19, 2010, at Gnomedex 10 in Seattle, Washington, and formally launched on October 10, 2010. by Johnny "Diggz" Higgins, and Willow Brugh as a fiscally sponsored program of The School Factory. In 2012, GWOB became a separate entity, fiscally sponsored by The School Factory.

== Organizational structure ==
Geeks Without Bounds is a non-profit organization, and is primarily volunteer driven. Operational activities are coordinated through a six-person board of directors which interact directly with sponsors and organizations around the world. They have organized hackathons, and networks of supportive hackerspaces in a variety of cities since 2010, and have partnered with the Random Hacks of Kindness project.

== Support and sponsors ==
Geeks Without Bounds is fiscally sponsored by Mentor House, an organization based in Tacoma, Washington. GWOB was originally founded as a project of School Factory and then spun out as its own organization under School Factory's fiscal sponsorship until that organization closed its doors in 2017.

Partners include Random Hacks of Kindness, NetHope, Startup World, and SoftLayer.

Individual event sponsors and partners have included Hewlett-Packard, The Next Web, AT&T, and the International Space Apps Challenge.

Organizational sponsors, along with donations from individuals, and grants fund the operational activities of Geeks Without Bounds.

In order to maintain transparency in accounting, income and expenses are provided to the public and published online.

== Humanitarian oriented activities ==
Much of their work has focused on providing humanitarian aid in areas recovering from natural disasters and similar crises, working with STAR-TIDES and Crisis Commons. They have an annual application cycle for projects that want to join the Accelerator for Humanitarian Initiatives.

=== Hackathons ===
Geeks Without Bounds has organized various humanitarian hackathons.

Year	Title	Location
2016	Gender-Based Violence	Ranchi, Jharkhand; India
2013	EveryoneHacks	Chicago, Illinois; United States of America
2013	EveryoneHacks	San Francisco, California; United States of America
2013	Hacking For Disaster 2.0	Birmingham; England
2012	Hacking For Disaster 2.0	Birmingham; England

- Helped with the organization of hacking mapping applications in response to Hurricane Sandy
- A volunteer group effort to build privacy tools for Mozilla Firefox at RHoKSec in Amsterdam

=== Field Projects ===
==== Oceti Sakowin camp infrastructure ====
GWOB assisted with setup and maintenance of electrical generation and distribution, as well as local wireless mesh networking and connection to the Lakota-owned Internet point of presence.

==== Reporting and response to water infrastructure problems ====
In Tanzania, GWOB helped launch a system by which local communities were able to directly report problems in the water infrastructure to the responsible agencies and receive ETA and other responsive information.

== See also ==
- eCorps
- Computer technology for developing areas
- Geekcorps
- Hackathon
- Humanitarian aid
- ICVolunteers
- Inveneo
- One Laptop per Child
- NetCorps
- NetDay
- Peace Corps
- Random Hacks of Kindness
- The School Factory
- United Nations Information Technology Service (UNITeS)
