= Strong Angel =

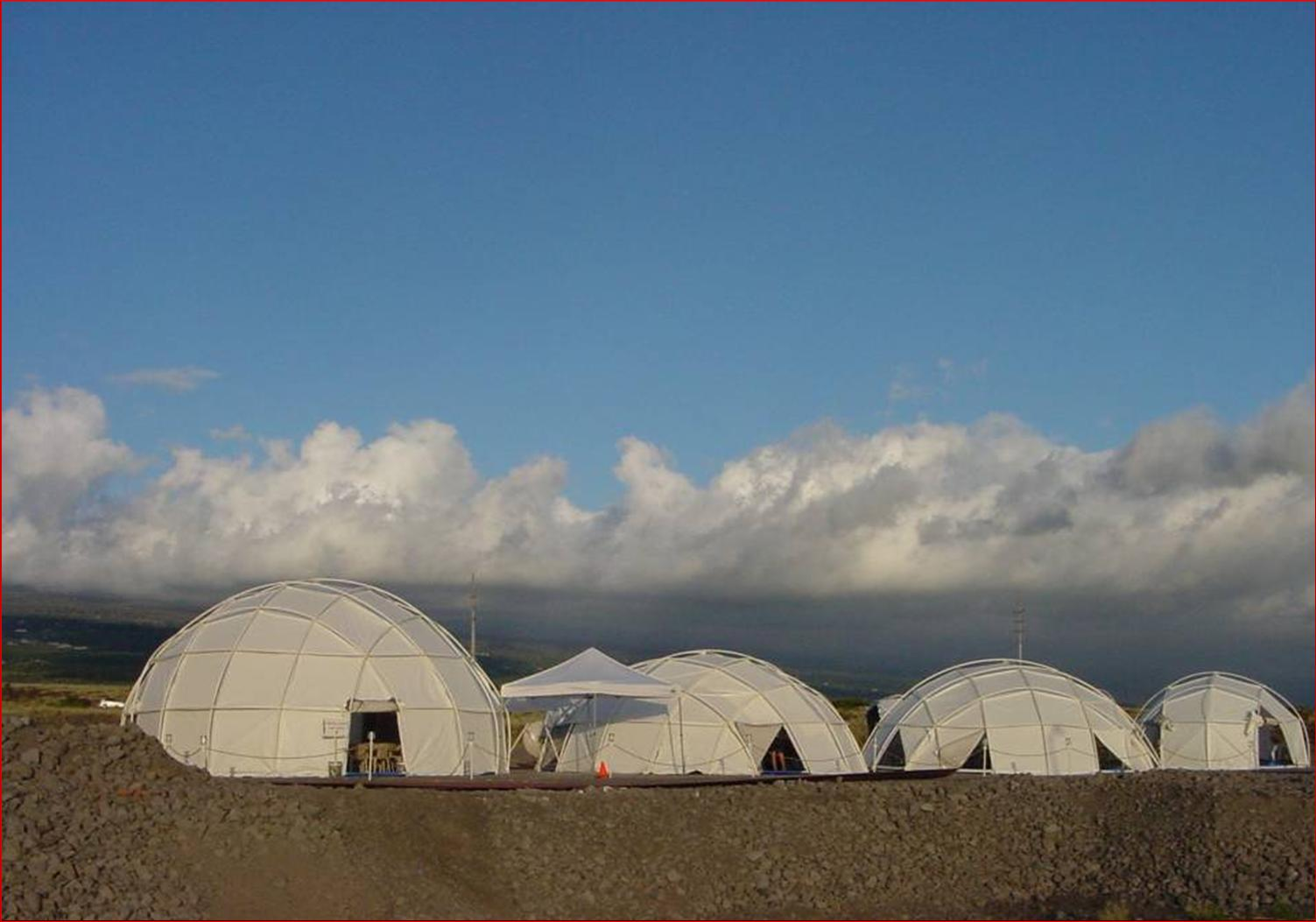
Strong Angel II site in Kona, Hawaii, July 2004

Strong Angel is an informal consortium of agencies and organizations that have hosted a series of international disaster response demonstrations leveraging public-private collaboration within a complex disaster response scenario. Since 1999 the Strong Angel series has focused on field experimentation within very challenging environments, testing cutting-edge techniques and technologies to facilitate more effective humanitarian response.

The name for the event, Strong Angel, was chosen to recognize two critical influences in the humanitarian response sector. The first was "Operation Sea Angel" in 1991, an impromptu rescue operation led by General Henry Stackpole leading a US Navy Amphibious Task Force in urgent response to an unnamed cyclone in Bangladesh. That rescue operation is generally credited with saving up to 200,000 lives and stimulated the entire research field around complex humanitarian response processes. The second influence was the insightful DARPA Program Manager, Dr. Gary Strong, who was responsible for the original civil-military integration concept.

There are several specific sectors tested in each Strong Angel event, with the general goals of (1) improved information flow, (2) the provisioning of urgent and sustainable critical services, and (3) transboundary cooperation, all in the aftermath of a disaster. The three Strong Angel demonstrations have been broadly international, with more than 15 nations participating in the 2006 event. The ethos of the demonstration is "radical inclusion" on the supposition that good ideas can come from anywhere - and especially from within the communities most at risk.

Everything any Strong Angel event creates is released to the public domain. Demonstrations have been held in 2000, 2004, and 2006, and the structural capability remains in 2026 within the Center for Resilient and Sustainable Communities (C-RASC) at George Mason University in Washington DC, and in the STAR-TIDES network established in the aftermath of the 2006 Strong Angel event.

== Team ==
The Strong Angel demonstrations have been designed and performed by a globally distributed team of experts led by Eric Rasmussen, MD, a former US Navy Commander and the Fleet Surgeon for the US Navy's Third Fleet. Members of the Strong Angel team have included medical, military, humanitarian, diplomatic, and technology experts. Team members have been drawn from the public and private sector, civilian and military, domestic and international, and they have included engineers, UN staff, humanitarian NGO workers, academic researchers, government employees from several nations, journalists, inventors, policy makers, and active duty military officers.

Vice-Admiral Dennis McGinn was a sponsor of the Strong Angel concept in 1999 and later served as the Assistant Secretary of the Navy for Energy, Installations, and the Environment.

Dr. Lin Wells, mentor to many of the Executive Committee members and source funding for the dominant share of the Strong Angel III budget, was the Chief Information Officer for the US Department of Defense and the Assistant Secretary of Defense for Networks and Information Integration. He later served as the Director of the Center for Technology and National Security Policy within National Defense University in Washington DC before his transition to the private sector in June 2014. At that point he had completed 51 years of government service. Dr. Wells, as of 2026, remains the founder and director of the STAR-TIDES network, established in 2007, and Executive Advisor to the George Mason University Center for Resilient and Sustainable Communities (C-RASC) , which was established in 2019 as a trans-disciplinary research and teaching center after a university-wide competition.

The Center for the Management of Information (CMI) at the University of Arizona provided significant planning, technical, and collaboration support to the first three Strong Angel events and professionally facilitated group meetings as part of a four-year DARPA investigation into collaboration methodologies with the US Navy's Third Fleet.

== Afloat Civil-Military Operations Center ==
One of the early concepts tested within the Strong Angel Demonstration was a shipboard Civil-Military Operations Center or CMOC, designed to be as valuable to the civilian humanitarian community as to the military, despite being located on a Navy warship.

In an uncommon gesture of civil-military collaboration, UN agency staff from World Food Programme, UNHCR, and UNICEF, as well as international military staff from Australia, Peru, Chile, and Japan, agreed to meet aboard the US Navy warship USS Coronado (AGF-11), the Command Ship for Third Fleet, five days before the start of the first Strong Angel event. While aboard, humanitarian staff were provided with office workspaces, living quarters, hot showers, good food, reliable communications (both voice and data), scheduled transportation ashore, and a range of humanitarian agency meeting spaces aboard the ship. The result was objectively and subjectively evaluated to be an improved civil-military planning integration which enhanced mutual understanding of the charters and obligations, strengths and weaknesses, on each side of the civil-military boundary. The results were eventually briefed personally to the Chairman of the Joint Chiefs of Staff and deemed a valuable model for civil-military collaboration.

Opportunities for early civil-military integration during the planning phase of operations have since been recognized and implemented for real-world events in Iraq (the Humanitarian Operations Center), in Afghanistan, and in the formation of the Combined Coordination Center during the response to the Indonesian tsunami. Those efforts proved beneficial, and resulted in the US Department of Defense creating a Joint Publication, JP 3-57, establishing doctrine around Civil-Military Operations. Templates and checklists for several classes of Navy ships and a range of disaster types remain available.

== Demonstration series ==
=== Strong Angel I in 2000 ===
The first Strong Angel (SA-I) was held near Puu Pa'a, Waimea, on the Big Island of Hawaii in June 2000 to address problems seen in the international response to the Kosovo refugee migration. Strong Angel participants established a distributed medical intelligence communications infrastructure at a mock refugee camp using the then-latest global communications technologies and lessons learned from the social sciences. That first Strong Angel, an ad hoc integration of UN relief agencies and international militaries working in concert toward a serious humanitarian problem generated positive press in both domestic US and international newspapers and magazines. Several reasons were proposed for the success, but credit must be given to the early support received from senior UN field staff present within the earliest planning conferences that were hosted by the US Navy. Benefit was also derived from the senior military commander at Strong Angel mandating military participation in a humanitarian effort at a level equal to the intensity required for combat. That requirement was later incorporated within the 2005 US Department of Defense Directive 3000.05, the seminal document mandating that the US military become effective at stability, security, transition and reconstruction (SSTR) operations, a subset of which is military support to humanitarian operations.

=== Strong Angel II in 2004 ===
The second Strong Angel (SA-II) was also held on a remote lava bed in Hawaii and, in 2004, pursued problems identified by members of the first Strong Angel team who were deployed to conflicts then underway in Afghanistan and Iraq. SA-II eventually incorporated 83 tasks designed to propose answers to problems seen in civil-military integration during those wartime deployments, including transboundary communications, civil-military transportation coordination, sustainable power provisioning, machine-based translation services, and competent cultural awareness. Over 60 staff on a remote and austere site on the lava beds north of Kailua-Kona, Hawaii, addressed that set of tasks. It resulted in alterations in tactics, techniques, and procedures regarding international and coalition civil-military operations.

=== Strong Angel III in 2006 ===
The third in the Strong Angel series, SA-III in 2006 was designed to address problems seen in multiple natural and man-made disasters where Strong Angel members had deployed since 2004. Those events include the South Asian tsunami in December 2004, Hurricane Katrina in August 2005, Hurricane Rita in September 2005, and the 2005 Kashmir earthquake. SA-III was held in San Diego, California from 20–26 August 2006 with San Diego State University hosting the Strong Angel team. The team members were drawn from US government agencies, international and domestic militaries, First Responders, domestic and international humanitarian organizations, academia, and private volunteers and there were more than 800 participants involved both locally on the ground in San Diego, and remotely in multiple countries around the world.

There were roughly 50 tasks and objectives identified for SA-III including the creation of community tools for use within a pandemic influenza response. The immediate goal after starting the demonstration was the development of a set of principles that would facilitate civil-military self-organization in future events. The overarching goal of the third SA event was more strategic than the first two events and promoted the development of tools and techniques for establishing a robust and resilient community-response capability for both natural and man-made disasters. The design of the week drew from the field experience of many agencies and entities with deep and successful experience in austere environments, including MedWeb for field diagnostics, telemedicine, and medical informatics, and the Naval Postgraduate School's Hastily Formed Networks for the urgent establishing of civil-military bridge mesh communications.

Among the other objectives within SA-III was the development of social tools and techniques that encourage collaborative cooperation between responders and the population they serve during post-disaster reconstruction. Those relationships had previously served as a source of tension between the responder's procedural requirements and the stated needs of the people directly affected by the events, and some progress was made toward procedures that might alleviate that friction.

The tools and techniques proposed for answering the tasks were selected for testing and demonstration based on several criteria, but each needed to be commercially availability for international deployment by the end of the 2006 calendar year.

=== The Future of the Strong Angel Series ===
Fortunately, the idea of a collaborative civil-military international disaster response capability is now relatively routine. US INDO-PACIFIC Command in Hawaii, for example, has established Pacific Angel as an annual event commemorating the original Strong Angel series and similarly dedicated to work on civil-military collaboration around the Pacific Rim.. However, as of 2026, the threats from climate change posed to Pacific Atoll Nations by sea-level rise, overwash events, and fresh-water shortfalls has brought the Strong Angel series design - an international disaster response demonstration - back into active discussion. One aspect of Strong Angel III in San Diego, for example, had been focused on infectious pandemics and, in addition to changes in climate, a number of remote and vulnerable Pacific island nations are suffering from relatively new infectious diseases like chikungunya and Zika virus, and a resurgence of more familiar diseases like dengue, typhoid fever, and resistant tuberculosis. Each of those issues are embedded within changing ecosystems and might benefit from a re-visiting of the problem set last addressed formally in 2006. Now, however, those problems could be addressed using exponential advances in technology, epidemiology, and data visualization, and a much deeper understanding of systems science, to assess the interventions that might improve the resilience of those vulnerable communities.
