= Eric Rasmusen =

American economist (Indiana University)

Eric Rasmusen is an American economist and former Professor of Business Economics and Public Policy at Indiana University Bloomington. He is the author of the book Games and Information: An Introduction to Game Theory.

In November 2019, Rasmusen was criticized by his university after a popular Twitter account posted a screenshot of one of his tweets that the Indiana University provost called "racist, sexist, and homophobic." Rasmusen had retweeted an article titled "Are Women Destroying Academia? Probably" with a quote: "geniuses are overwhelmingly male because they combine outlier IQ with moderately low Agreeableness and Moderately low Conscientiousness."

The university stated that they could not fire Rasmusen "because the first amendment of the United States constitution forbids us to do so". Rasmusen posted a rebuttal to his personal website, in which he defended his Twitter activity and argued that he was being silenced for "dissident" beliefs. Rasmusen retired in 2021.
