= ICVolunteers =

International non-profit organization

- Formation: 1997; 29 years ago
- Type: Non-profit, Social and Humanitarian organization
- Location(s): Geneva, Switzerland, with country offices in France, Spain, Mali, South Africa, Canada and Senegal
- Coordinates: 46.190083°N 6.143332°E
- Key people: Viola Krebs, Adama Samassékou
- Volunteers: 13,000
- Website: www.icvolunteers.org

ICVolunteers (ICVolontaires / ICVoluntarios) is an international non-profit organization (federation) active in the field of communications, in particular cyber-volunteerism, languages and conference support. ICVolunteers works with volunteers to implement social and educational programs to help populations and local communities to develop. It cooperates with organizations in the humanitarian, social, environmental and medical fields to implement projects and conferences at local, national and international levels. In addition, ICVolunteers promotes volunteerism and its recognition, by enhancing civic commitment and involvement, and by providing leadership and links between organizations, individuals, and communities. With its headquarters in Geneva (Switzerland), ICVolunteers has offices and permanent representation in several other countries, including France, South Africa, Mali, Spain, Brazil and Canada.The work of ICVolunteers began was in 1997.

== Network ==
ICVolunteers is a network organization, linking knowledge with needs. Its network includes close to 14,000 individuals, volunteers, and partners worldwide, speaking 170 different languages and residing in over 180 countries.

== Programs and projects ==
Programs include the CyberVolunteers Program which recruits, trains and coordinates volunteer with information and communication technology skills for development. Volunteers participate in local, regional and international projects for several weeks or months, offering their skills in areas such as web or software development, system administration and content generation.

Projects include Africa@home, a volunteer computing initiative involving CERN and academic institutions from Europe and Africa. Among the programs of ICVolunteers are E-TIC.net, an information program that aims to empower local communities through the meaningful use of communication and the sharing of knowledge in a collaborative and hands-on fashion, especially in the Sahel region, MigraLingua, through which community interpreters assist migrants and Green Voice, a communications initiative focusing on environmental education for young people. ICVolunteers closely works with the United Nations and non-governmental organizations for humanitarian, social conferences, and events.

== See also ==
- eCorps
- Geekcorps
- Geeks Without Bounds
- NetDay
- NetCorps
- Peace Corps
- United Nations Information Technology Service (UNITeS)
