= World Computer Exchange =

- Founded: 2000
- Type: 501(c)(3)
- Purpose: Computer reuse and education
- Location: Hull, Massachusetts
- Employees: 2
- Volunteers: 300–400 active
- Website: worldcomputerexchange.org

World Computer Exchange (WCE) is a United States and Canada based charity organization whose mission is "to reduce the digital divide for youth in developing countries, to use our global network of partnerships to enhance communities in these countries, and to promote the reuse of electronic equipment and its ultimate disposal in an environmentally responsible manner." According to UNESCO, it is North America's largest non-profit supplier of tested used computers to schools and community organizations in developing countries.

== History ==
WCE was founded in 1999 by Timothy Anderson. It is a non-profit organization. Its headquarters are in Hull, Massachusetts, and there are 15 chapters in the US and five in Canada. In 2015, WCE opened a chapter in Puerto Rico.

By November 2002, the organisation shipped 4,000 computers to 585 schools in many developing countries.

By October, 2011, along with partner organizations, WCE has shipped 30,000 computers, established 2,675 computer labs. In February 2012, the Boston Chapter sent out their 68th shipment bringing their total to 13,503 computers.

== Activities ==
WCE provides computers and technology, and the support to make them useful in developing communities. WCE delivers educational content and curriculum on agriculture, health, entrepreneurship, water, and energy. The program also ensures that teachers will know how to use the technology and content by providing staff and teacher training, as well as ongoing tech support.

Each chapter of WCE collects donated computers, refurbishes and prepares them for shipment. They also raise funds to ship the computers. Volunteers inspect and repair each computer, then install the operating system and educational material onto each computer.

WCE calls recipients of its computers "partners." The requests of computer donations originate from the partners. Once the refurbished computers and the funds to ship the computers are fulfilled, WCE initiates shipment. When possible, WCE coordinates shipments with other organizations, such as University of the People, Peace Corps, Computers4Africa.org, ADEA (Assoc. for the development of Education in Africa) and others.

In June 2013, WCE Chicago chapter sent 400 computers to Mexico, and 300 to the Dominican Republic with help of 85 volunteers.

In November 2015, WCE sent two Spanish speakers to visit Honduras for two weeks in 2015 to pilot tech skills training for youth under a contract with World Vision.

The WCE Computers for Girls (C4G) initiative is field testing of eight tools to provide technological training and STEM education for interested teachers helping their girl students in four West African countries (Ghana, Liberia, Mali, and Zambia) and Pakistan.

In September 2016, World Computer Exchange-Puerto Rico and 4GCommunity.org, two not-for-profit corporations, have announced their alliance to improve public school and family access to technology where needed throughout Puerto Rico.

== eCorps ==
To install computers at partner sites without access to experts, WCE recruits and supports volunteers from the USA under its eCorps initiative. To be eligible, volunteers must be 21 years of age, have necessary tech skills, and be prepared to self-fund their travel and accommodation expenses. 18 eCorps training teams have worked in Dominican Republic, Ethiopia, Georgia, Ghana, Honduras, Kenya, Liberia, Mali, Nepal, Nicaragua, Nigeria, Philippines, Puerto Rico, Tanzania, and Zimbabwe.

The eCorps "Travelers" program is geared towards those already planning to go to one of the countries in the WCE network, to provide tech support during their trip. 79 eCorps "Travelers" have visited the following 41 developing countries including: Armenia, Bolivia, Cambodia, Cameroon, Democratic Republic of Congo, Dominican Republic, Ecuador, Ethiopia, Haiti, Honduras, India, Indonesia, Jordan, Kenya, Liberia, Malawi, Mexico, Namibia, Nepal, Pakistan, Palestine, Panama, Peru, Puerto Rico, Qatar, Senegal, Sierra Leone, South Africa, Swaziland, Tanzania, Togo, and Uganda. In 2015, "Travelers" visited: Cambodia, Haiti, Honduras, Mexico, Puerto Rico, and South Africa.

== Computers ==
WCE uses the Ubuntu operating system on their computers, citing the cost of license and being less prone to malware while providing a computing environment such as word processor and printer drivers. Unlike One Laptop per Child, the computers do not contain specialized software. Each computer is loaded with educational materials to allow users to learn without an internet connection.

== See also ==
- Computer recycling
- Electronic waste in the United States
- Empower Up
- Free Geek
- Geekcorps
- Geeks Without Bounds
- Global digital divide
- ICVolunteers
- Inveneo
- NetCorps
- NetDay
- Nonprofit Technology Resources
- United Nations Information Technology Service (UNITeS)
