= Carl Ryanen-Grant =

American historian

Carl Winslow Ryanen-Grant (November 7, 1975 – February 28, 2000) was the 1997 University Medalist at the University of California, Berkeley. He received national media attention that year for academic successes realized while battling melanoma.

Born in San Francisco, California, Ryanen-Grant was raised in the suburb of Concord. While pursuing a degree in history at UC Berkeley, Ryanen-Grant was diagnosed with the deadly skin cancer in early 1996, at the age of 20. Despite the seriousness of the disease and ensuing treatment regimens, Ryanen-Grant continued to maintain a perfect grade point average while directing the university's internship program. He was also elected for early initiation to Phi Beta Kappa society.

In 1997, Ryanen-Grant was awarded the University Medal, UC Berkeley's highest academic honor, given annually to the most distinguished graduating senior. While the award committee insisted that Ryanen-Grant was selected strictly on the basis of his academic achievements, Carl's story of success in the face of illness garnered a flurry of media attention, both locally and nationally.

That year, Ryanen-Grant was selected as the ABC News "Person of the Week," and was also profiled in People magazine. He addressed Berkeley's 1997 graduating class, jokingly acknowledging his status as the "opening act" for keynote speaker Bill Cosby.

Ryanen-Grant went on to work full-time at the Oakland Museum, and later at UC Berkeley's Bancroft Library. Although Ryanen-Grant had been declared cancer-free after surgery in late 1996, the aggressive melanoma returned a few months later. After an extended battle with the disease, he succumbed in 2000, at the age of 24.
