= Eric Rasmussen (physician) =

American physician

Eric Rasmussen, MD, MDM, FACP
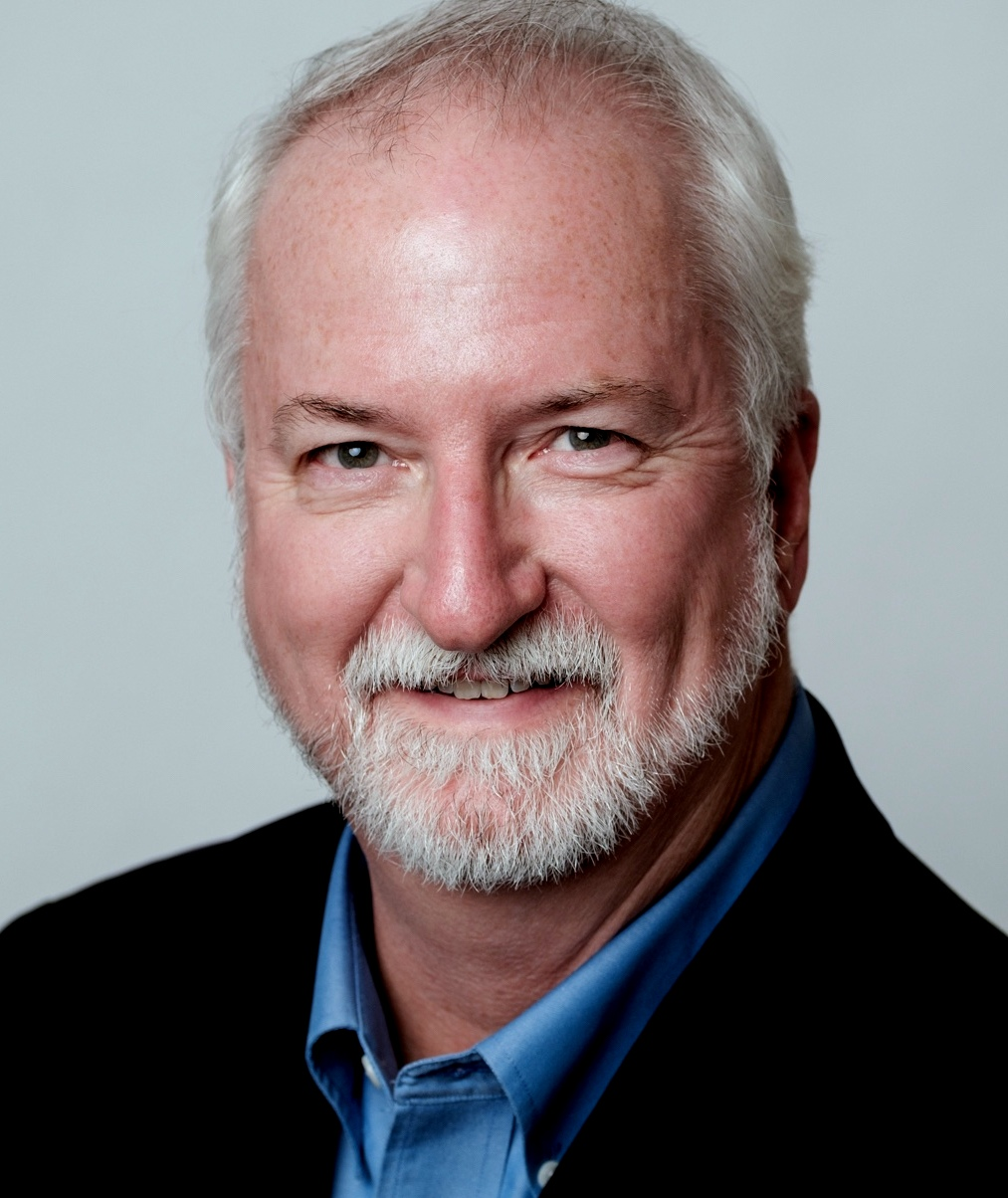
- Born: March 17, 1957 (age 69); Sacramento, California, U.S.
- Education: Stanford University and Stanford University School of Medicine
- Occupation: Physician
- Title: CEO
- Website: www.ihs-i.com

Eric David Rasmussen (born March 17, 1957) is an American medical doctor specializing in methods for global disaster response and their intersection with modern medical ethics. He was selected as the founding CEO of the TED Prize awarded to Larry Brilliant of Google.org in 2006 and in 2013 became the CEO of Infinitum Humanitarian Systems, a Seattle-based international consulting firm specializing in the humanitarian sciences.

Rasmussen spent 25 years on active duty with the US Navy pioneering the specialty of humanitarian medicine inside the military, working to improve healthcare within highly vulnerable populations in war zones and in the aftermath of natural disasters.

Between 1995 and 2014, he worked to develop protocols, tools and techniques used in humanitarian operations. Many of these were initiated during a series of international disaster response demonstrations called Strong Angel held in 2000, 2004, and 2006.

On retiring from the Navy in 2007 he was selected by the executive director of Google.org to become the founding CEO of the 2006 TED Prize called InSTEDD which has become a successful NGO, receiving substantial funding from sources such as the Rockefeller Foundation, Google investor John Doerr, and Google's charitable arm Google.org. As of 2026 he remains chair of the board of directors at InSTEDD.

In 2013 Rasmussen was appointed to serve as CEO of Infinitum Humanitarian Systems (IHS) where, in addition to continued work in disaster informatics and developing engineering techniques for providing clean drinking water in slums, he leads the global disaster response team for the Roddenberry Foundation supported by the Star Trek franchise. In August 2014 he was appointed Core Faculty in both Medicine and Global Grand Challenges at Singularity University within the NASA Ames Research Center.

== Early life and education ==
Rasmussen was born in Sacramento, California, and attended Palm Springs High School in Palm Springs, California. He enlisted in the Navy at age 17 and spent seven years as a Sonar Technician aboard nuclear submarines (USS GATO, SSN-615 and USS SILVERSIDES, SSN-679), before leaving the Navy to attend St. John's College in Santa Fe, New Mexico. He left St. Johns to join the molecular genetics staff at GenBank, a part of Los Alamos National Laboratory.

From Los Alamos, he was selected in 1985 as founding director of the American University of Les Cayes, which was then being established in Haiti and which is now part of the American University of the Caribbean. While working in Haiti, Rasmussen was accepted to Stanford University, where he completed his undergraduate degree and entered Stanford University School of Medicine.

== Career ==
Rasmussen graduated from Stanford as a Doctor of Medicine (MD) with Research Honors in 1990, then completed a residency in Internal Medicine at the University of Texas Southwestern Medical Center at Dallas (Parkland Hospital). He re-entered the Navy as Chief Resident in Medicine at the Navy Medical Center in Oakland, California after becoming Board-certified in Internal Medicine in 1993. In 1996 he was appointed Fleet Surgeon to the US Navy's Third Fleet.

After a Navy career that included serving as chairman of the department of medicine at the Naval Hospital near Seattle, Washington, he retired from the Navy in 2007 and accepted an offer from Google.org to become the founding CEO of InSTEDD, a humanitarian informatics NGO founded by Dr. Larry Brilliant from his TED Prize in 2006. Innovating in both technical and social systems, the InSTEDD team worked with the Mekong Basin Disease Surveillance Consortium to create tools that collected, mapped, and disseminated health informatics more rapidly than emerging infections could spread, and every tool has been released as free and open-source. Rasmussen led InSTEDD for three years before shifting in 2010 to Chair of InSTEDD's board of directors.

In 2013 Rasmussen co-founded (with Alex Hatoum) Infinitum Humanitarian Systems (IHS), a multinational consulting group specializing in humanitarian engineering. After working in Mexico, Yemen, Haiti, Puerto Rico, Chile, and Ukraine, plus several countries in Asia and the Western Pacific, Rasmussen and Hatoum developed IHS into a "profit-for-purpose" company. IHS is focused on technical methods for climate change adaptation, especially for vulnerable populations in a Low Elevation Coastal Zone.

In 2022 Rasmussen's work with the IHS team on Kwajalein Atoll in the Marshall Islands led to the Marshallese creation of the Kwajalein Atoll Sustainability Laboratory (KASL), supported by the US Office of Naval Research. In 2023 Rasmussen was appointed principal scientist and research director at KASL.

He is currently, in 2026, a member of the Loomis Council at the Stimson Center in Washington DC, the managing director of the Applied Hope Foundation, and a National Fellow of The Explorers Club.

His other appointments include research professor in environmental security and global medicine at San Diego State University and affiliate associate professor of medicine at the University of Washington School of Public Health. His international appointments include senior lecturer at the International Disaster Training Academy in Bonn, Germany (Bundesamt für Bevölkerungsschutz und Katastrophenhilfe) and lecturer at the Academy for Disaster Reduction in Beijing, China.

== Humanitarian initiatives ==
As one of the early proponents of collaborative civil-military operations in disaster response, Rasmussen's publications include clarifying the optimal role of the military in disaster response, establishing a shared response culture with NGOs for disasters, incorporating survivors in response designs, and leaving beneficial infrastructure like power generation, communications capability, and water purification systems behind. Other specific topics have included:

- Using free and open-source tools for mapping and communication
- Legislation that allows military humanitarian responders to leave critical response infrastructure behind with the affected population, such as area lighting, broadcast transmitters, and electrical generators, when the humanitarian mission is concluded.
- Language in the documents for humanitarian field demonstrations and real-world operations that described humanitarian support competence to be as important as combat operations competence for those charged with humanitarian support responsibilities. That language was later echoed in Section 4.1 of Department of Defense Instruction 3000.05 in November 2005.
- The concept of radical inclusion, which Rasmussen has described as a meme borrowed from the Burning Man Arts Festival incorporating ideas from every contributor for evaluation, no matter how unlikely the source.
- The concept of demonstrations in humanitarian support research – where problems from recent humanitarian responses are collected from those who suffered them, and field trials then are held in similarly austere conditions to allow a range of possible solutions to those problems to be tried without fear of failure and with collaboration an intentional focus.
- A 10-20-30 Document of recommendations for civil-military interaction in disaster support. It is a listing of advice collected from a wide range of international civil-military participants who were asked, “What would you want to tell those coming behind you about your experiences?” The name derives from the paper's design as 10 Commandments, 20 Recommendations, and 30 Advisories and is focused on the military perspective.

== Other ==
In addition to his past and current work in humanitarian support, Rasmussen is also:

- The author of the Stanford Affirmation, a replacement for the Hippocratic Oath now recited by new physicians in a number of medical schools around the globe. The original illuminated manuscript of the Affirmation was calligraphed by the San Francisco Art Institute and signed by Rasmussen and ten other influential signatories, including Dr. John Steward, then dean of the school of medicine at Stanford. That mounted manuscript now hangs in the office of the dean of students at Stanford School of Medicine.
- The author of the Reference Card for Military Medical Ethics, created in the aftermath of revelations from the prisons at Guantanamo Bay and Abu Ghraib and carried by military medical professionals into the theaters of Iraq and Afghanistan beginning in 2005.

== Awards ==
- 2014 – Fellow of The Explorers Club
- 2007 – Presidential Legion of Merit (Department of Defense)
- 2006, 2005, 2004, 2003 – Letters of Commendation, Office of the Secretary of Defense (total of 8 Letters)
- 2006 – Chief Resident's Award for Faculty Excellence in Clinical Leadership, Naval Hospital Bremerton
- 2003 – 2005 Campaign and Expeditionary Medals for Iraq, Afghanistan and the Global War on Terrorism
- 2005, 1979 – Humanitarian Service Medal (with star for Second Award)
- 2004 – Teacher of the Year, Department of Medicine, Naval Medical Center, San Diego
- 2004, 2001, 1998 – Meritorious Service Medal, with two stars for subsequent awards (Department of Defense)
- 2003 – Navy Commendation Medal
- 2003 – Sustained Excellence in a Principal Investigator (Annual Capstone) – DARPA
- 2003 – Joint Service Achievement Medal (Department of Defense)
- 2003 – Presidential Unit Citation
- 2002 – Navy Unit Citation
- 1997 – Fellow of the American College of Physicians
- 1996 – Surface Warfare Insignia
- 1979 and 1976 -Submarine Dolphins Breast Insignia, US Nuclear Submarine Service (SSN-615, SSN-679)
- 1978, 1980 – Navy and Marine Corps Achievement Medal (two awards)
- 1976 – Meritorious Unit Commendation
- 1976 – Navy Expeditionary Medal
