= Geekcorps =

Non-profit organization

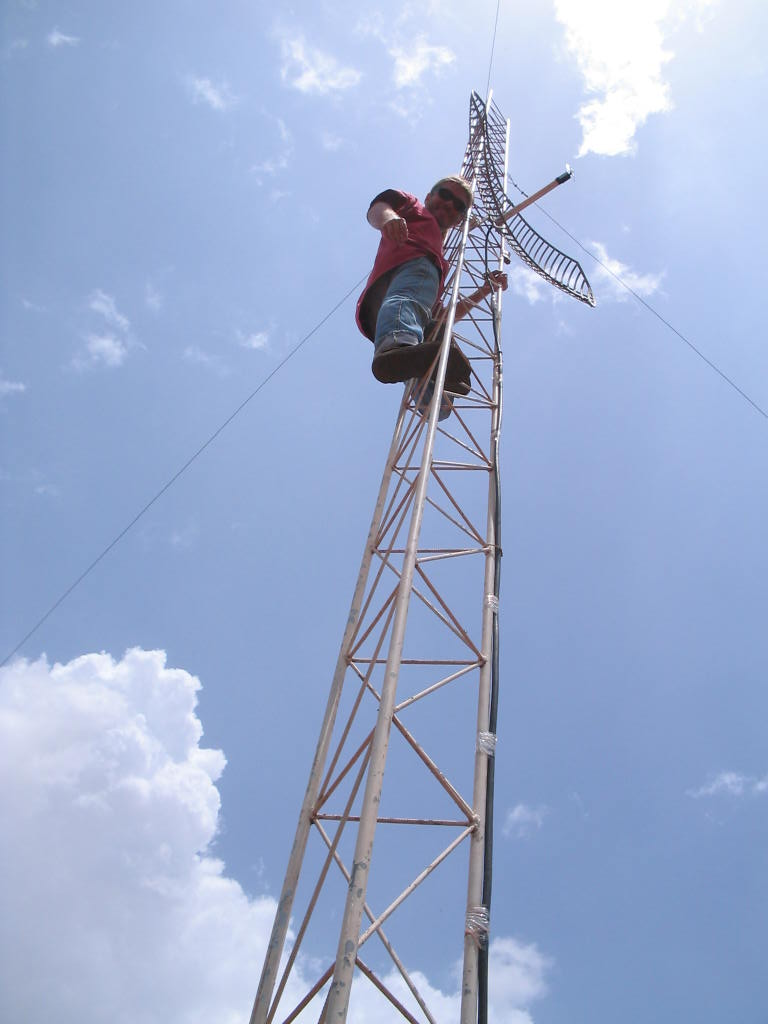
A Geekcorps volunteer setting up a Wi-Fi antenna in Mali

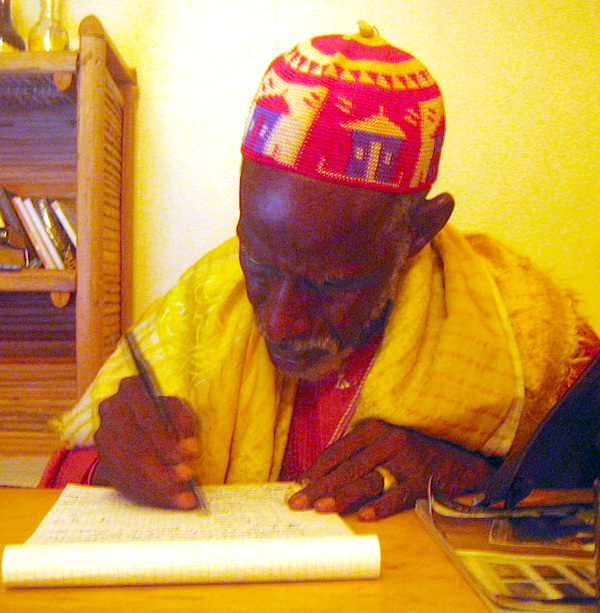
A Malian man writes an article ("Wisdom") for the Fula language Wikipedia in the Geekcorps Mali headquarters.

Geekcorps was a non-profit organization that sent people with technical skills to developing countries to assist in computer infrastructure development. The organization recruited volunteers for tours lasting from one month to over six months.

The non-profit was created in February 18, 2000 by Ethan Zuckerman and Elisa Korentayer in North Adams, Massachusetts. In 2001 Geekcorps became a division of the International Executive Service Corps located in Washington, D.C.

== Creation ==
After a visit to a Ghana library by Zuckerman in 1993, the lack of up-to-date resources available prompted him to create Geekcorps years later. Humanitarian and banker Elisa Korentayer became co-founder of Geekcorps due to the organization's need of financial wisdom. In effort to increase access to current information and bridge the digital divide in developing nations Zuckerman, and associates from his now bought out internet company tripod, funded most of the $350,000 budget for Geekcorps' first year.

== Major projects ==
=== Ghana ===
Starting September 2000, with 6 volunteers selected from over 200 applicants, Geekcorps first mission was in Accra, Ghana. Co-founder Zuckerman was already familiar with the infrastructure of Ghana. Zuckerman stated, "The government has relatively liberal telecommunications and investment policies, making it possible for IT businesses to be built there." Geekcorps initial focus in Ghana was assisting companies in the capital city Accra with its IT expertise. Geekcorps had an understanding with local businesses, after receiving help, the businesses involved were to help the locals with their newfound resources. Initial challenges for Geekcorps were communication and teaching skills needed by volunteers, and reliance on outdated programming languages for local businesses. Geekcorps involvement led to innovations such as a new java based payment system for local businesses in Ghana. Geekcorps was also instrumental in the creation of Ghana's internet exchange point in 2005.

=== Mali ===
Initial assistance in Mali came from the CMRT (Community Mobilization through Radio Technology) program sponsored by USAID. Under CMRT, Geekcorps installed 5 radio stations to enable local communication through the area. Later under another program Radio for Peace Building, Geekcorps installed another 11 stations, and renovations were done to older existing stations.

Geekcorps set up ICT stations in less populated areas of Mali in 2006. These stations were updated by a memory stick delivered from a computer center with internet access in Ouelessebougou. Although this allowed many rural locations access to specific web resources, such as web pages and digital media, due to lack of interest the program was modified after a year, as Olivier Alais, Geekcorps' Mali country director, explained. Yearly updates to more desired information such as Moulin, a French version of Wikipedia, became the focus.

== Intel partnership and OLPC astroturf controversy ==
In 2007 Geekcorps Director Wayan Vota was accused of disparaging the OLPC project through an "OLPC News" website without disclosing Geekcorps' promotion of Intel's rival laptop, the Classmate PC and Microsoft's Windows XP.. By the mid 2000s, Geekcorps had grown to over 1,600 registered volunteers drawn from companies including Netscape Communications and the UK Department of Trade. The organization adopted an open source software philosophy for its projects to ensure that implementations were replicable by communities without access to US funding or licensed software. Around 2006, co-founder Ethan Zuckerman stepped down as CEO and subsequently left the organization entirely, taking up a fellowship at Harvard's Berkman Center for Internet and Society. Following internal changes at IESC, Geekcorps ceased to operate as an independent entity and was absorbed into IESC's broader ICT programming, with the North Adams head office closing and its staff departing. IESC continued to operate ICT programs under the Geekcorps name as a subsidiary division through at least 2013.

== See also ==
- eCorps
- Geeks Without Bounds
- ICVolunteers
- Inveneo
- One Laptop per Child
- NetCorps
- NetDay
- Random Hacks of Kindness
- United Nations Information Technology Service
