= Crisis camp =

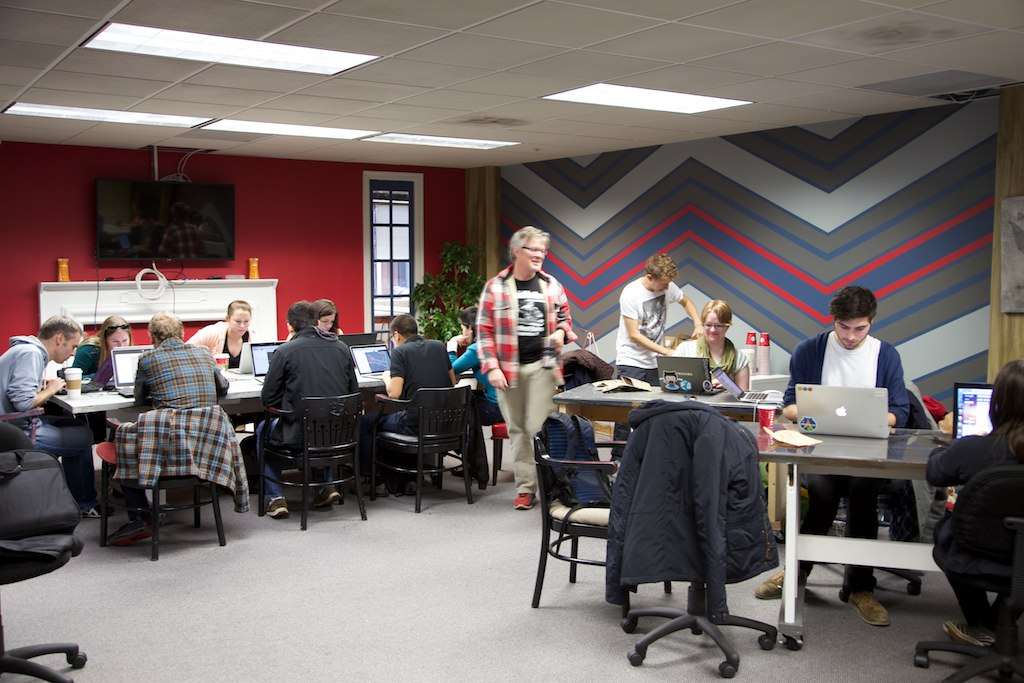
Room with people at tables working on laptops at Crisis Camp DC.

A crisis camp is a BarCamp gathering of IT professionals, software developers, and computer programmers to aid in the relief efforts of a major crisis such as those caused by earthquakes, floods, or hurricanes. Projects that crisis camps often work on include setting up social networks for people to locate missing friends and relatives, creating maps of affected areas, and creating inventories of needed items such as food and clothing.

Previous efforts of crisis camps reveal common themes such as the use of mobility, the use of the Internet as a common coordination platform, the requirement of volunteers, and the need for alternative community communication access areas. This initiative is reported to have a unique format that features free or nominal attendance fees as well as agenda that are created in real time by the participants. This format has also been referred to as "unconference", which reject one-size-fits-all presentations in favor of innovative gathering with no predetermined speaker or sessions as activities are led by participants themselves. The emergence of EdCamp, which is a user-generated gathering for educators has been modeled after BarCamp.

Following the 2010 Haiti earthquake, many crisis camps were set up around the world, often under the name "Crisis Camp Haiti", to help with the relief effort. Due to the 2011 Tōhoku earthquake and tsunami, the Crisis Commons volunteer community was mobilized and part of the effort is being coordinated by Japanese students at U.S. universities.

The first Crisis camp was held in Washington, DC on June 12–14, 2009.
