= Random Hacks of Kindness =

Charitable organization

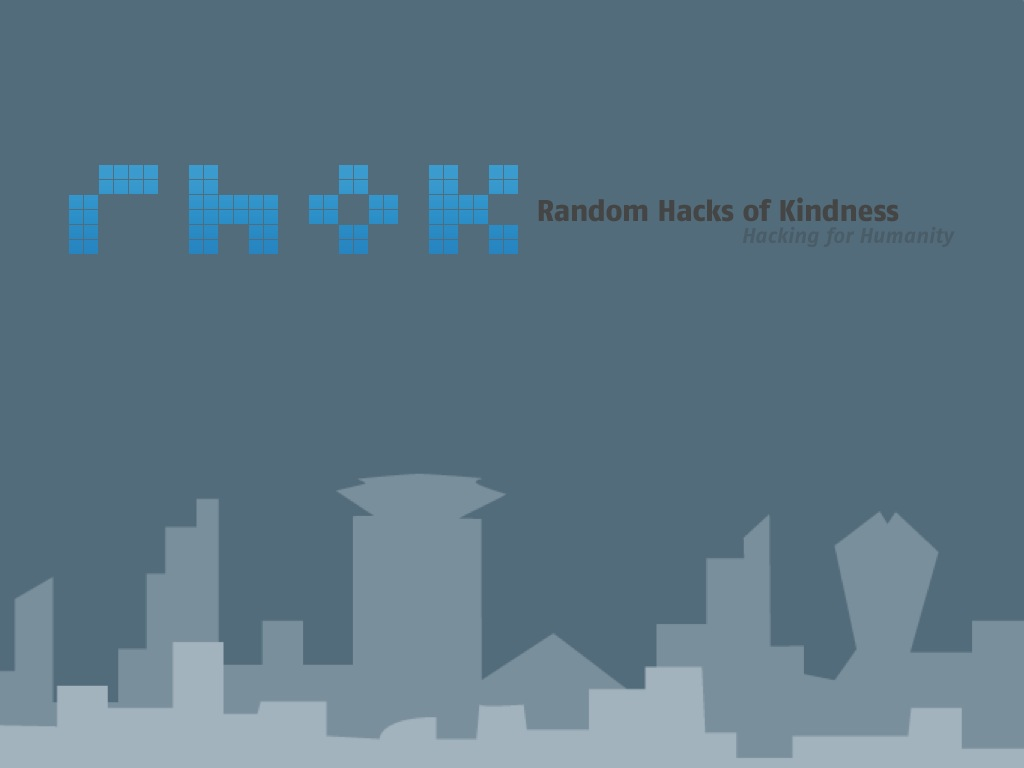

Random Hacks of Kindness (RHoK) was a global community of technologists dedicated to solving problems for charities, non-profits and social enterprises by organising recurring hackathons. It was started in 2009. The organization had a presence in over 20 cities throughout 5 continents, and had 2000 participants in 2017.

== History ==
=== Origins ===
Random Hacks of Kindness grew out of an industry panel discussion at the first Crisis camp Bar Camp in Washington, D.C. in June 2009. Panel attendees included Patrick Svenburg of Microsoft, Phil Dixon and Jeff Martin of Google and Jeremy Johnstone of Yahoo!. They agreed to use their developer communities to create solutions that will affect disaster response, risk reduction and recovery. The idea was for a "hackathon" with developers producing open source solutions. The World Bank's Disaster Risk Reduction Unit (Stuart Gill) and NASA's Open Government team (Robbie Schingler) joined the partnership and these "founding partners" (Microsoft, Yahoo, Google, NASA and the World Bank) decided on the name "Random Hacks of Kindness" for their first event.

An innovation incubator in the area of sustainable development, SecondMuse acts as "operational lead" for Random Hacks of Kindness, coordinating global volunteer efforts, facilitating collaborative partnerships, and managing communications and branding.

=== 2009: RHoK 0 ===
The first Random Hacks of Kindness (RHoK 0) was held at the Hacker Dojo in Mountain View, California on November 12–14, 2009. FEMA Administrator Craig Fugate gave the keynote and made a call to action to the developers to apply their creativity to the challenges and featured hacks. The first RHoK event is known as RHoK 0 after 0-based array indexing in computer programming.

Tweak the Tweet was a featured project that was later used during the Haiti earthquake response in January 2010.

=== 2010: RHoK 1.0 and 2.0 ===
The second RHoK event was held at the Microsoft Chevy Chase offices in Washington DC on June 4–6, 2010. Crisis Commons hosted a Crisis Camp co-located. The reception for RHoK 1.0 was held at the US State Department, and was blogged by Aneesh Chopra, the United States Chief Technology Officer.

While the Washington, DC RHoK was the "main stage", several other locations hosted satellite events at the same time, including Oxford England, Jakarta Indonesia, Sydney Australia, Nairobi Kenya, São Paulo Brazil, and Santiago Chile.fd

The "winning" hack at the Washington DC event was a new interface on CHASM (Combined Hydrology and Stability Model), a system to make landslide predictions. CHASM continues to be developed and is supported by groups including the World Bank.

The third Random Hacks of Kindness was held on December 4 and 5, 2010, in 21 cities on 5 continents.

=== 2011 - 2013: RHoK 3.0, 4.0 and 5.0 ===
The fourth Random Hacks of Kindness (RHoK 3.0) was held in 2011 in the cities of: Buenos Aires, Toronto, Nairobi, Lusaka, Bogota, San Pablo, Singapore, Tel Aviv, Birmingham, México DF, Juárez, Atlanta, Chicago, New York, San Francisco, and Seattle. The most active city to be participant was Buenos Aires, which was held in the Globant office and the participants included Guibert Englebienne (CTO of Globant) and Alejandro Pablo Tkachuk (ex-Globant and now CTO of Calculistik).

RHoK 3.0 was held twice in 2012: On the 3–4 June and again on the 1–2 December. This saw multiple cities come into play and a huge turnaround of developers from all over the world including Cape Town. The focus of the hackathon was toilets and/or sanitation.

The sixth global hackathon (RHoK 4.0) was also a major success. It was held twice in 2013 (in June and in December). UN Secretary General Ban Ki-moon gave the keynote speech at New York. Also speaking at NYC were NASA Deputy Administrator Lori Garver, Google vice president for research Alfred Spector, Microsoft Director Patrick Svenburg, Parsons The New School for Design Dean Joel Towers and UN Global Pulse director, Robert Kirkpatrick.

=== 2017 - 2018 ===
In 2017 rebuilding of the global community continued, and connections with all the active RHoK communities around the world were reestablished. The global community grow considerably, with events over 6 cities in Australia and 3 in India, as well as events in Ottawa, Berlin, Washington DC, Pretoria, and Ghana.

=== 2021 - 2022 ===
The global community maintained a strong foothold in Australia having bi-annual hackathons. A new Copenhagen chapter was established in 2021 and planning for the first hackathon occurred in April 2022.

== Open source code ==
Random Hacks of Kindness required all contributions and code produced during RHoK hackathons to be released under an OSI-approved open source license and in a public code repository. RHoK maintained GitHub repositories which contained code for many of the hacks.

== See also ==
- Code for America
- Geekcorps
- Geeks Without Bounds
- NetCorps
- Peace Corps
- United Nations Information Technology Service (UNITeS)
