= Paquet =

Paquet is a French surname. Notable people with the surname include:

- Alain Paquet (born 1961), Canadian politician
- Anselme-Homère Pâquet (1830–1891), Canadian physician and politician
- Benjamin Pâquet (1832–1900), Canadian priest
- Carolanne D'Astous-Paquet (born 1990), Canadian singer
- David Paquet, Canadian playwright
- Eugène Paquet (1867–1951), Canadian politician
- François-Xavier Wurth-Paquet (1801–1885), Luxembourgian politician
- Gilles Paquet (1936–2019), Canadian economist
- Jean-Guy Paquet (born 1938), Canadian scientist and businessman
- Kévin Monnet-Paquet (born 1988), French football player
- Louis-Honoré Pâquet (1838–1915), Canadian priest and teacher
- Ophelia Paquet, Tillamook woman involved in an Oregon court case in 1919 about legal recognition of marriage across racial lines
- Peggy Paquet, (born 1970), German psychotherapist and pharmacist
- Philippe Paquet, former French jockey
- Thérèse Paquet-Sévigny, Canadian diplomat

== See also ==
- 15278 Pâquet, an asteroid
- Saint-Raymond/Paquet Aerodrome, a Canadian aerodrome
- Paquette
