= Ophelia (given name) =

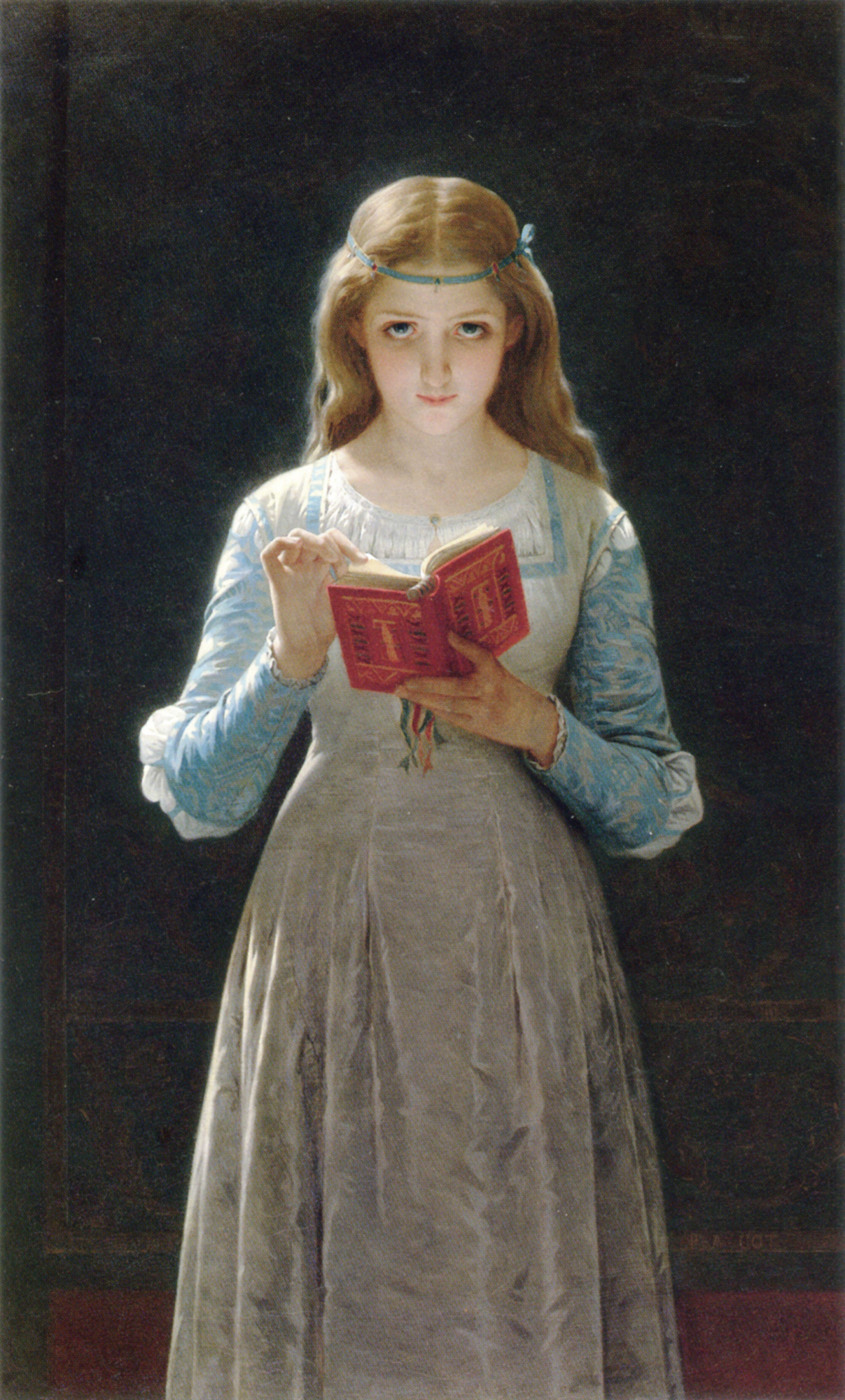
- Ophelia or Pause for Thought by Pierre Auguste Cot, 1870.
- Gender: female

Origin
- Origin: Greek
- Meaning: help

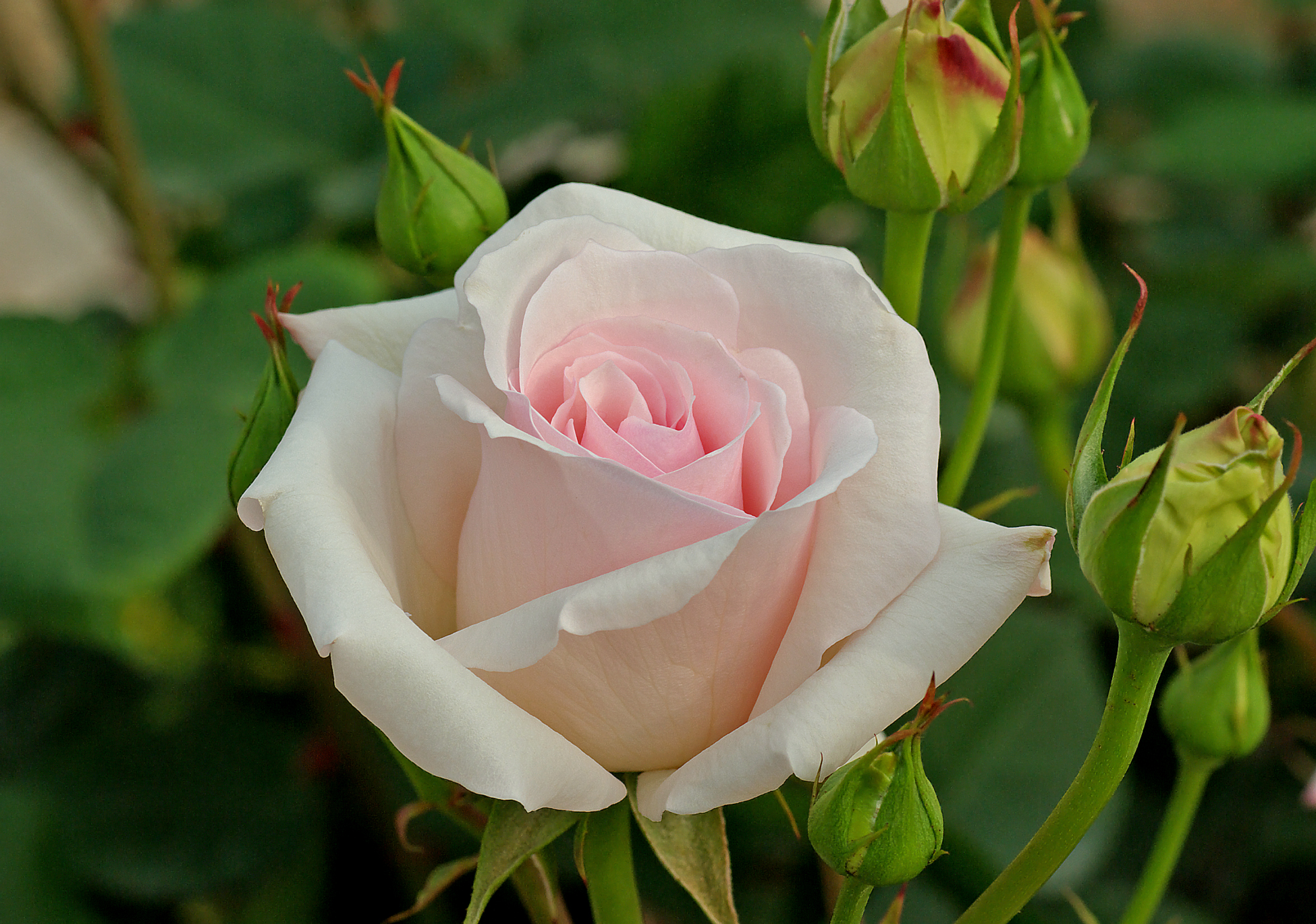
The hybrid tea rose Ophelia.

Ophelia is a feminine given name, probably derived from the Ancient Greek word ὠφέλεια (ōphéleia, "benefit").

The name is best known as a character from William Shakespeare's Hamlet who has a tragic end. More modern associations, including Ophelia, a song by The Lumineers, now also influence perceptions of the name, which also has a history of use dating back to the late 1800s. Author Laura Wattenberg noted that the name is elegant, exotic, and similar in style to the popular name Olivia but has a more Gothic, romantic sensibility that some parents find appealing. Ophelia has also been the subject of numerous songs, paintings, film and television productions.

Ofelia is the Spanish-language spelling of the name.

== Usage ==
The name has ranked among the top 1,000 names for girls in the United States since 2015 and among the top 300 since 2022.

It has also increased in usage in England and Wales, where it has been ranked among the top 500 names since 2009 and among the top 100 names for girls since 2022. It also ranks among the top 200 names in Canada, where it ranked 152nd on the popularity chart in 2021.

== People with the given name ==
=== Ophelia ===
- Ophelia Gordon Bell (1915–1975), English sculptor
- Ophelia Benson (born 1948), American author, editor, blogger, and feminist
- Ophelia Cabral (1938–2016), Indian actress, singer, playwright and director
- Ophelia Clenlans (c. 1841–1907), American civil rights activist and journalist
- Ophelia Crossland (born 1983), Ghanaian fashion designer
- Ophelia Dahl (born 1964), British social justice and health care advocate
- Ophelia DeVore (1922–2014), American businesswoman, publisher and model
- Ophelia Dimalanta (1932–2010), Filipino poet
- Ophelia Settle Egypt (1903–1984), American social worker, educator, sociologist and writer
- Ophelia Ford (born 1950), Tennessee politician
- Ophelia Hayford (born 1973), Ghanaian politician
- Ophélia Kolb (born 1982), French actress
- Ophelia S. Lewis (born 1961), Liberian author
- Ophelia Lovibond (born 1986), English actress
- Ophelia Marie (born 1951), Dominican singer
- Ophelia Nick (born 1973), German veterinarian and politician
- Ophelia Paquet, Tillamook woman involved in an Oregon court case related to the legal recognition of interracial marriage
- Ophelia Pastrana (born 1982), Colombian-Mexican physicist, economist, speaker, YouTuber, technologist and comedian
- Ophelia Hoff Saytumah, Liberian politician

=== Ofelia ===
- Ofelia Calcetas-Santos (died 2011), United Nations rapporteur
- Ofelia Cano (born 1959), Mexican actress
- Ofelia Domínguez Navarro (1894–1976), Cuban writer, teacher, lawyer, feminist and activist
- Ofelia Echagüe Vera (1904–1987), Paraguayan painter and educator
- Ofelia Esparza (born 1932), Chicana altar artist
- Ofelia Fernández (born 2000), Argentine politician and political activist
- Ofelia Fox (1923–2006), Cuban poet, lecturer and radio personality
- Ofelia Garcia (disambiguation), multiple people
- Ofelia Gelvezon-Tequi (born 1942), Filipino visual artist
- Ofelia Giudicissi Curci (1934–1981), Italian poet and archaeologist
- Ofelia Guilmáin (1921–2005), Spanish actress
- Ofelia Hooper (1900–1981), Panamanian sociologist, poet, professor and civil rights activist
- Ofelia Malinov (born 1996), Italian volleyball player
- Ofelia Malcos Amaro (born 1968), Mexican politician
- Ofélia Marques (1902–1952), Portuguese painter, caricaturist and illustrator
- Ofelia Márquez Huitzil (born 1959), Mexican artist
- Ofelia Medina (born 1950), Mexican actress, singer and screenwriter
- Ofelia Montesco (1936–1983), Peruvian-born actress
- Ofelia Nieto (1898–1931), Spanish singer
- Ofelia Olivero, Argentine-American biologist
- Ofélia Ramos (born 1970), Portuguese politician, lawyer and businesswoman
- Ofélia Ramos Anunciato (1924–1998), Brazilian chef
- Ofelia Rey Castelao (born 1956), Galician historian, writer and professor
- Ofelia Rodríguez Acosta (1902–1975), Cuban writer, journalist, feminist and activist
- Ofelia M. Samar-Sy (born 1962), Filipino physician
- Ofelia Schutte (born 1945), Panamanian philosopher and professor
- Ofelia Taitelbaum (born 1949), Costa Rican politician and businesswoman
- Ofelia Uribe de Acosta (1900–1988), Colombian suffragist
- Ofelia Zepeda (born 1952), American poet and intellectual

== Fictional characters ==
- Ophelia, a character from William Shakespeare's Hamlet
- Ofelia, a character in Pan's Labyrinth
- Ophelia, a character in Claymore
- Ophelia, a character from APB: Reloaded
- Ophelia, a character from Brütal Legend
- Ophelia, a character from Romeo × Juliet
- Ophelia, a character from Trading Places
- Ophelia, the daughter of Odin, a character from Fire Emblem Fates
- Ophelia Frump, of the television series The Addams Family
- Ophelia Nigmos, a character appearing in The Sims 2
- Ophelia Ramírez, of the television series The Life and Times of Juniper Lee
- Ophelia St. Clare, of the novel Uncle Tom's Cabin
- Ofelia Salazar, fictional character in Fear the Walking Dead
- Ofelia Santoro, a character in the book Third and Indiana
- Ophelia Sarkissian, a Marvel Comics character and often foe of Captain America and the Avengers
