= Infostate =

Infostate is an index used to measure the Digital Divide. It was proposed by Orbicom, the International Network of UNESCO Chairs in Communications, in "Monitoring the Digital Divide… and beyond". The conceptual framework of the index introduces the notions of a country's infodensity and info-use. Infodensity refers to the stocks of ICT capital and labour, including networks and ICT skills, indicative of a country's productive capacity and indispensable to function in an Information Society. It includes ICT networks, machinery, and equipment, as well as ICT skills, indispensable for the functioning of information, knowledge-oriented societies. Info-use refers to the uptake and consumption flows of ICTs, as well as their intensity of use by households, businesses and governments and the intensity of their actual use. Infostate is an aggregation of Infodensity and Info-use indexes and represents the degree of a country's ‘ICT-ization’. The Digital Divide is then defined as the relative difference in infostates among economies.

The Infostate index is used as a base for another index, the ICT Opportunity Index, proposed by ITU, International Telecommunication Unit in “From the Digital Divide to DIGITAL OPPORTUNITIES: Measuring Infostates for Development”. The ICT Opportunity Index is in fact the merger of two well known initiatives, ITU's Digital Access Index (DAI) and Orbicom's Monitoring the Digital Divide/ Infostate conceptual framework and model.

== Main works ==
- Sciadas, G. (Ed.) (2005). From the Digital Divide to Digital Opportunities. Montreal: Orbicom.
- Sciadas, G. (2004). International Benchmarking for the Information Society. Busan: ITU
- Sciadas, G. (Ed.) (2003). the Digital Divide... and Beyond . Montreal: Orbicom.
- Sciadas, G. (2002). Monitoring the Digital Divide. Montreal: Orbicom.
