= Orbicom =

Orbicom may refer to:

- Orbicom-UNESCO, a UNESCO committee fostering education and growth of communications technology internationally.
- Orbicom Pty Ltd, a Wireless Telecommunication Services provider.
