= Meaningful Broadband =

Meaningful broadband is an ethics-driven framework for closing the digital divide in Asia. It has been adopted by Indonesia and Thailand, and it has influenced other Asian nations. According to the framework, each nation needs a “meaningful broadband ecosystem,” in supply side and demand side dimensions, that would optimize the role of the internet in reducing poverty, and supporting sustainable development, while also fostering meaningful (non-addictive) behavior among low-income citizens.

== History ==
Meaningful broadband was authored by Craig Warren Smith, Chairman of Digital Divide Institute, in 2001 when he had a joint appointment as visiting scholar overseen by Professor Jeff Sachs at Harvard and Professor Alex "Sandy" Pentland at MIT. Later, in 2003 he furthered meaningful broadband as a visiting professor of Harvard Kennedy School of Government teaching science and technology deployed to National University of Singapore’s Lee Kuan Yew School of Public Policy. At that time, Smith was invited by Arun Shourie, ICT Minister of India and Chairman of the Asia Pacific ICT Ministers Association, to introduce Meaningful Broadband to ministers to India and eventually to government ministers by lecturing in Bangladesh, Sri Lanka, Nepal, Vietnam, and Malaysia.

In 2006, the first nation to formally adopt Meaningful Broadband as national policy was Thailand. The Thai telecommunications regulatory agency, National Broadcasting and Telecommunications Commission (NBTC), formulated plans to establish a meaningful broadband ecosystem in a remote province of Thailand called Maha Sarakham and to activate a "meaningful technology index" that would be an ethics based regulatory strategy that would award spectrum to projects that score high on the index. In Thailand, The Center for Science, Technology, and Society continues to incorporate programming in Meaningful Broadband in its sector in applied ethics at Chulalongkorn University.

In the following year, Republic of Indonesia began a 15-year embrace of Meaningful Broadband, led by Ilham A Habibie, son of a former President of Indonesia and current director of the government’s National ICT Council. Since 2012, Meaningful Broadband has been tested among various local regencies in Indonesia, supported by a technical team from World Bank Indonesia.
