= Recode (non-profit organization) =

Nonprofit organization

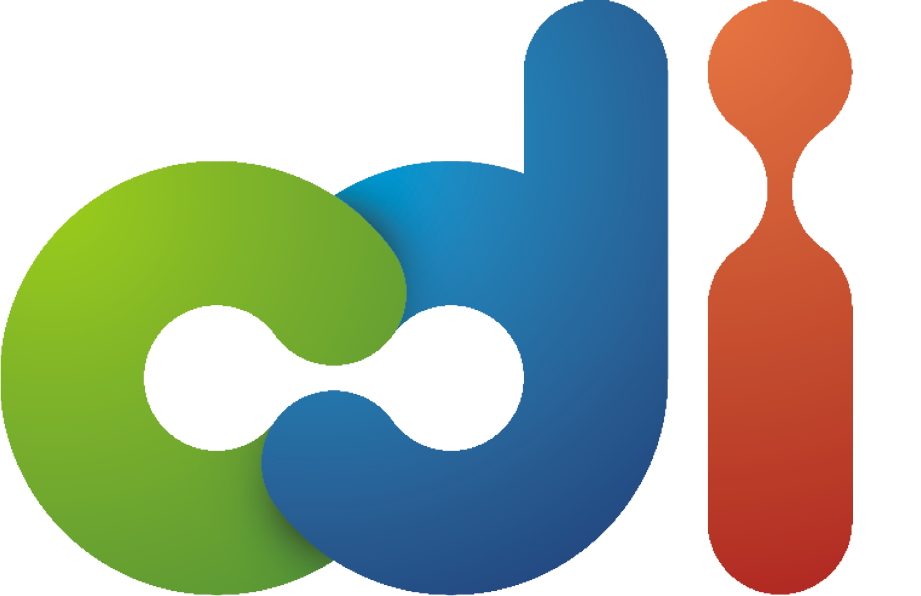
- Founded: 1995
- Founder: Rodrigo Baggio
- Type: Non-profit Organization
- Purpose: Overcome the digital divide
- Location: Rio de Janeiro, Brazil
- Website: recode.org.br
- Formerly called: Center for Digital inclusion

Recode, formerly the Center for Digital inclusion (CDI), is a nonprofit organization that uses technology to fight poverty and stimulate entrepreneurship. CDI and partners create community centers in low-income, rural, indigenous communities, hospitals, prisons, and psychiatric clinics. These centers work to strengthen low-income communities by providing access to information and communication technologies.

The National Digital Inclusion Alliance, a US-based nonprofit organization has defined digital inclusion as follows: Digital Inclusion refers to the activities necessary to ensure that all individuals and communities, including the most disadvantaged, have access to and use of Information and Communication Technologies (ICTs). This includes 5 elements: 1) affordable, robust broadband internet service; 2) internet-enabled devices that meet the needs of the user; 3) access to digital literacy training; 4) quality technical support; and 5) applications and online content designed to enable and encourage self-sufficiency, participation and collaboration.

Changed in 2015 to Recode and recode.org.br.

== Overview ==
Rodrigo Baggio founded the Comitê para Democratização da Informática (roughly translated as "Committee for Democracy in Information Technology" in the Portuguese language) in 1995. Its plan was social entrepreneurship to overcome the digital divide. CDI is a network of self-managed and self-sustaining CDI Community Centers throughout Brazil and 13 other countries – monitored and coordinated by their 23 regional offices. Schools are located in low-income communities, indigenous communities, psychiatric clinics, hospitals for mentally and physically disabled, and detention facilities. CDI is an international non-governmental organization (NGO) headquartered in Rio de Janeiro, with operations in the US, Europe and Latin America.

CDI helps disadvantaged groups use Information and Communication Technologies (ICTs). CDI community centers are technology and learning centers in impoverished communities. Each community center is a partnership with an existing grassroots organization. The community-based organizations provide the infrastructure, and CDI provides free computers and software, implements educational methods, trains instructors and monitors the schools.

== Methodology ==
CDI community centers are self-managed and self-sustainable. Students collectively identify a common challenge facing their community and prepare an action plan to overcome it. Issues can range from sexual abuse, pollution, violence, crime, and drugs, to lack of health care or schools. Students can take the technical skills they’ve learned in class to mobilize their communities, engage in advocacy and awareness campaigns, and work together to solve that specific problem.

== Recognition ==
After a pilot program in two favelas, Ashoka: Innovators for the Public provided initial funding for three years starting in 1996.

The AVINA Foundation, the Inter-American Development Bank, Schwab Foundation for Social Entrepreneurship, Skoll Foundation, Tech Museum, Unicef and Unesco also provided support. CDI founder Rodrigo Baggio was named by the World Economic Forum as one of “100 Global Leaders for Tomorrow”, by Time magazine as one of the 50 leaders in Latin America that will make a difference in the third millennium, by CNN, Time and Fortune as one of the world’s ten “Principal Voices in Economic Development”. In 2009 he was invited to join the Strategy Council of the UN’s new Global Alliance for Information and Communication Technologies and Development and the Clinton Global Initiative.

== International expansion ==
CDI opened development offices in New York City (with 501(c)(3) US tax status) in 2007 and London in 2008 (UK Registered Charity), using the same acronym with an English language expansion (Centre for Digital Inclusion or CDI Europe in the UK). With the support of James Wolfensohn, former president of the World Bank and the Wolfensohn Institute, as of 2011 CDI planned to expand to the Middle East and North Africa, to be followed by India and other parts of Africa.

Since 2010, CDI UK is called CDI Apps For Good. Apps for Good is an acclaimed education movement where young people in schools learn to create apps that can change their world, according to CDI's methodology.

During April- June 2010, CDI Apps for Good ran the first pilot course with nine unemployed young people aged 16–25 at High Trees Development Trust in South London. Apps for Good has grown significantly and now has nearly 655 schools in the UK delivering the courses to more than 100,000 students aged 11 to 18.
