= Digital rights in the Caribbean =

Digital rights—human rights in relation to digital technologies—present particular challenges in the Caribbean countries, due to its geographies, political context, social inequalities and cultural diversity. While they face the same problem of digital divides as other regions, for islands the impacts of not accessing or understanding digital technologies can have particularly harmful consequences. Similar concerns could be found in terms of gender-based violence online, a global problem encompassing psychological, physical, emotional and sexual violence. This affects more acutely girls and young women and brings about special concerns within the Caribbean. However, there are other topics which are utmost problematic because of the history and type of applicable law system in countries from this region, such as in the case of digital identity and internet shutdowns. Despite variations across Caribbean countries, issues happening in one country can be replicated within the region or can affect people living in other countries.

== Digital ID ==
=== Jamaica ===
There have been two attempts to implement the National Identification System (NIDS) bill in Jamaica. The first one was proposed in 2017 and dropped in 2019, when the Court indicated that the bill was being unjustifiably breaching Jamaicans' rights to privacy and equality, among others. In 2020, a new version of the bill was proposed. In 2021, civil society served recommendations to parliamentarians but most of them were not taken into account.

One of the many criticisms is the disproportionately large amounts of personal information being collected. Gathering biometric data was particularly signaled to be not necessary to provide legal identity and being a target for potential leaks and illegitimate access. The Jamaican government has already mistakenly exposed personal data, as seen in the JamCOVID app scandal that made public the immigration record of hundreds of thousands of travelers, as well as their COVID test results.

Other concerns expressed to parliamentarians and senators include opening the door for the disclosure of information to third parties in the future, and dismissing stronger safeguards for authentication logs, potentially providing space for profiling and surveilling citizens. In October 2021 the Lower House passed the bill.

=== Dominican Republic ===
In the Dominican Republic, a new Digital ID legislation was accelerated in 2014 with the support of the United Nations and World Bank to align local policies with international regulations, such as the European Union. This has been criticised in terms of the effectiveness of its promises to address issues of statelessness, poverty and social inclusion, especially amongst disadvantaged populations such as afro-descended, indigenous and women.

In 2020, protests erupted from civil society over trust issues and limitations to access basic services that the Digital ID system was representing. Furthermore, investigations showcased how the system was reinforcing vulnerabilities. For example, by creating higher complexities to access or renew digital ID among groups historically excluded from foundational identity systems. The case of Haitian migrants in DR and Dominican citizens of Haitian descendent was presented to be significantly illustrious, which for 80 years the Dominican state has battled to not recognise their nationality.

Besides its implications for the right to privacy, the Digital ID system has been problematised for excessively affecting the access to basic services, such as welfare, transport, health and education. Finally, it has been highlighted the overall lack of accountability of the purposes for which data collected is being used and its implications with other fundamental rights. The case of Digital ID in DR has been thoroughly discussed in the investigation "Legal Identity, Race and Belonging in the Dominican Republic. From Citizen to Foreigner" by Eve Hayes de Kalaf .

== Internet shutdowns ==
=== Cuba ===
On multiple occasions, the internet shutdowns internet shutdowns in Cuba have coincided with protests opposing the government. ETECSA is the only internet service provider in the country, making it easier to cut the communications. Some recent incidents include:

On November 27, 2020, an internet shutdown was reported during protests led by artists, including the San Isidro Movement, who denounced repressive measures and censorship from the authorities.

On January 27, 2021, a two-hour internet outage was reported during protests in front of the Ministry of Culture, demanding an answer on the detention of some artists. The internet access remained intermittent the rest of the day.

On July 11, 2021, during massive Cuban protests demanding food, water, medicine, COVID-19 vaccines and other items, several platforms showed that the internet traffic went down. The Interamerican Commission on Human Rights called for Cuba to fulfill its human rights obligations on the right of protest.

Other forms of digital censorship, like directed outages and blocking apps have also been reported in 2020 and 2021.

== Digital Divides ==
Digital divides in access have particularly acute implications in Latin America and the Caribbean (LAC), as it remains the most socially unequal region in the world. This context is not an exception in the Caribbean, where countries have represented the highest and lowest levels of digital development. According to Data from the International Telecommunication Union (ITU), by 2017 Barbados and St. Kitts and Nevis were leading the Americas' rankings of ICT access, following the United States and Canada. On the other hand, Belize, Guyana, Cuba and Haiti represented the lowest positions of the regional charts.

Data from the Inter-American Development Bank (IADB) evidenced that the prevalence of the digital gap impacted especially the region's rural population by 2018/2019. The Caribbean countries with high-level connectivity in rural areas were the Bahamas, Barbados and Panama, at the mid-level were Dominican Republic and Trinidad and Tobago, while within the lower level were Belize, Guyana and Jamaica. Not accessing the internet can have greater negative consequences for islands, especially after the COVID pandemic. Being offline can broaden the population's isolation, for example by reducing its possibilities to access information, be active in the labour market and receive aid from international agencies.

== Gender based violence online ==
Research from the Web Foundation on Gender Based Violence (GBV) online presented how this issue can amplify digital divides among women and girls, with digital abuse being far worse among black and LGBTQ+ communities. According to research from The Economist, 38% of women globally have been subjects of digital violence, which was identified by the Web Foundation to stagger to 52% among young women and girls. Examples of gender based violence are identity thefts, physical and sexual threats, doxxing and sharing of non-consensual images. In relation to younger generations, Plan International conducted research in 2020 amongst more than 14,000 girls and young women from 31 countries. The study showcased that 58% had experienced online harassment and 50% indicated that they have faced more of these experiences online than on the street.

GBV online represents a greater challenge in the Caribbean. By 2015 four of its countries had the highest rates of sexual violence and between 20 and 35% of women had experienced physical, sexual or psychological violence. Amongst the most notable cases was the experience of Becky Dundee, a Guyanese-American lesbian. Her TikTok and Twitter publications became viral through large amounts of negative comments criticizing her masculine appearance. Furthermore, in Jamaica, a research was especially illustrious on this situation where two-thirds of respondents had observed online harassment and 76% indicated that sexually related harassment was a major problem.
