= Digital divide in South Africa =

Differences in access to information technologies

The digital divide is described as the characterization of the gap between individuals or countries that have access to information and communications technologies, primarily telecommunications and the Internet, and individuals or countries that do not. This also includes, but is not limited to: access to computers, broadband, information literacy and digital skills.

The primary dimensions of the digital divide are geography (urban vs rural) and income (rich vs poor), but other dimensions include: gender (men vs women), age (young vs old), ethnicity or race (white vs black), linguistic (English-speaking vs non-English-speaking) and literacy (literate vs illiterate).

In particular, South Africa faces many developmental problems that make it one of the more complex societies in the world to map the digital divide in. The country is divided by ethnic inequality and discrepancies in the level of development between different sectors. These obstacles result in disparities in access to information and communications technology (ICT). This disparity is commonly known as the digital divide. There has been another major contributor, namely, Telkom and its monopolistic hold on the progress of ICT in South Africa. South Africa faces unique challenges in addressing the digital divide, including ethnic inequality, disparities in development levels between different sectors, and a historically monopolistic telecommunications industry. Efforts to bridge the digital divide in South Africa involve a combination of government initiatives, non-governmental organizations (NGOs), non-profit organizations (NPOs), and public-private partnerships, all working towards increasing access to technology, promoting digital literacy, and enhancing digital skills among the population.

== Telecommunications ==
South Africa started the development of a local telecommunications industry in 1958. Despite a rather successful state policy for some two decades, the old state policies can no longer keep up with new designs of digital equipment. Many proposals are currently being discussed within the government and the telecommunications industry itself for future development. One attempt to liberalize the communications industry was to end the monopoly of Telkom and open up the sector for market competition. In addition, since the change in technology is so rapid and radical, local firms find themselves increasingly obsolescent in technology because the import and manufacture of digital equipment are expensive and its continual updating is necessary.

== Government ==
The introduction of e-governance such as the implementation of online governmental websites has been proven to be a huge challenge to South Africa. Still, today the South African government impedes progress, many in this industry would agree, the reason they restrict growth in certain areas is simply that they have no understanding of the benefits. According to Kroukamp (2005), political leaders are reluctant to bring changes to the IT policies that are thought to be unnecessary. In many cases, changes are only made to satisfy the needs of the government instead of citizens. In the social context, available websites might not reach everyone, since people speak different mother tongues.

== Education ==
Between 2000 and 2003, there was a growth rate of 59 percent in the number of schools with computers, mainly in secondary schools. Despite a high growth rate, at the national level, 39 percent of schools in South Africa have computers and 26 percent use computers for teaching and learning. It follows that more than half of the schools in South Africa cannot provide students with any computer facility. Statistics have also shown that there is a stark regional disparity in the growth rate of ICT, with Gauteng, Northern Cape and Western Cape far ahead of other provinces. In relation to Research, Africa has made a number of tangible developments which will assist greatly as part of its economic development.

In both primary and secondary schools, basic computer knowledge is being taught. However, there is a disparity in the capabilities of students and teachers to use ICT effectively to integrate technology into teaching and learning.

== Internet ==
According to Global Data statistics, by the end of 2024, 74,7 percent of the entire population in South Africa has access to the Internet. Having an average Internet speed of about 1 Mbit/s, the country's connection speed is below the 2 Mbit/s Broadband international average. Hence, South Africa's low access rate to the Internet and below average connection speed make it difficult for the country to compete with other countries in attracting foreign investments. In a study conducted in 2011, they estimate that internet access is only available to roughly fourteen percent of the African population.^{[14]} This means that while the world's population is only composed of fifteen percent of Africans, around six percent of that subscribe to the internet.^{[15]}

== Initiatives for Digital Inclusion ==
A variety of digital inclusion efforts have been introduced in South Africa to tackle the digital divide. These endeavors are focused on providing access to ICTs, fostering digital literacy, and enhancing digital skills among the population. NGOs, NPOs, government projects, and public-private collaborations have all contributed to reducing the gap in digital accessibility and knowledge.

=== Digital Inclusion ===
A number of NGOs and NPOs are actively working to narrow the digital divide in South Africa. These organizations concentrate on various aspects of digital inclusion, such as enabling access to technology, nurturing digital literacy, and delivering training in digital skills. Some prominent organizations are:

- The Click Foundation: This foundation employs technology and creative solutions to boost literacy rates in disadvantaged schools. They supply digital learning resources and help teachers integrate technology into their classrooms, encouraging digital literacy among students. https://www.clickfoundation.co.za/
- SchoolNet South Africa: SchoolNet SA offers support and training for teachers and schools in incorporating ICTs into their classrooms. They provide workshops, materials, and networking opportunities for educators to share best practices and learn about new technologies that can enhance education. https://www.schoolnet.org.za/
- The Digital Education Show Africa: As an annual event, this show highlights the latest developments, technologies, and best practices in digital education, promoting the use of technology in African schools. The event connects educators, policymakers, and technology providers to examine innovative ways to address the digital divide and improve educational outcomes. https://www.terrapinn.com/exhibition/digital-education-africa/index.stm

=== Government Programs ===
The South African government has introduced several initiatives to address the digital divide, with an emphasis on infrastructure development, technology access, and digital skills training:

- South Africa Connect: This national broadband policy aims to provide all South Africans with high-speed broadband access by 2020. The policy centers on infrastructure development, affordability, and digital skills development to ensure that everyone can engage in the digital economy. https://www.dtps.gov.za/images/phocagallery/Popular_Topic_Pics/SA-Connect-Policy.pdf
- Operation Phakisa: This initiative is focused on enhancing the use of ICTs in education, particularly in rural areas. Its goals include supplying schools with digital resources, training teachers to use technology effectively in the classroom, and fostering digital literacy among students. https://www.operationphakisa.gov.za/operations/education/pages/default.aspx
- e-Skills Institute: This government program promotes digital skills development and digital literacy among South African citizens. It offers training courses, workshops, and resources to help individuals and organizations develop the necessary skills to succeed in the digital era. https://www.nemisa.co.za/skills-development/e-skills-institute/

=== Public-Private Collaborations ===
Public-private partnerships have also contributed to addressing the digital divide in South Africa by pooling resources and expertise from both sectors to provide access to technology, digital skills training, and support for innovation:

- Project Isizwe: This partnership between the South African government, private sector firms, and local communities aims to offer free Wi-Fi access in public spaces throughout the country. By providing affordable internet access, Project Isizwe enables more South Africans to access digital resources and develop digital skills. https://www.projectisizwe.org/
- Microsoft 4Afrika Initiative: This Microsoft initiative seeks to empower African youth, entrepreneurs, and business leaders by providing affordable access to technology, fostering innovation, enhancing world-class skills, and delivering relevant African content. https://news.microsoft.com/africa/4afrika/

== See also ==
- Open access in South Africa to scholarly communication
