= Paquette =

Paquette is a surname. Notable people with the surname include:

- B. P. Paquette, Canadian film director, screenwriter, producer and academic;
- Brad Paquette, American politician;
- Cedric Paquette, Canadian hockey player;
- Craig Paquette, American baseball player;
- Gilbert Paquette (born 1942), Canadian politician;
- Gordon Paquette (1916–1995), American politician;
- Karl Paquette, étoile at the Ballet de l'Opéra National de Paris;
- Kathleen Paquette, American politician;
- Leo Paquette, American chemist;
- Pierre A. Paquette, Canadian politician;
- Renee Paquette, Canadian TV personality currently with All Elite Wrestling, known as Renee Young during her tenure with WWE;
- Robert Paquette, Canadian singer-songwriter;
- Robert L. Paquette, (born 1951), American historian;
- Stéphane Paquette, Canadian singer-songwriter;
- Yanick Paquette, American illustrator.

== Fictional characters ==
- Paquette, a character in Voltaire's novel Candide
- Natalie "Wattson" Paquette, a character in Respawn Entertainment's Apex Legends.

== See also ==
- Paquet
