= Digital divide in Germany =

Differences in access to information technologies

Flag of Germany

The digital divide in Germany, the second most populous state and leading economic powerhouse in Europe, refers to the ever-growing gap between members of society without computer or Internet access and those with access. There are several factors contributing to the digital divide in Germany, including age, gender, family structure, education, ethnicity, and motivation. With a large market of Information and Communications Technology (ICT) in Germany, there are still areas that don't have access to high-speed internet. Internet access in Germany is more available in big cities compared to rural communities. The German government has taken initiative to increase internet access through the rural communities by adding free internet access throughout the communities, as well as, increase internet education in schools.

== ICT related to Germany ==
While, overall, Germany's ICT market is the fourth largest worldwide and the largest in Europe, high-speed internet is hardly seen in its more rural areas.

ICT stands for information and communication technologies, and includes any devices and systems utilized in digital technology and communication. That being said, the ICT market involves the buying and selling of these devices and systems. Germany's Its ICT market grew significantly between 2004 and 2014. Revenue from foreign exports in ICT services jumped from $10.2 billion to $25.8 billion. In 2014 alone, revenue from foreign exports in ICT hardware and consumer electronics that were made in Germany reached $37.3 billion. Market researcher Marketline predicted a compound annual growth rate of 5.5 percent between 2016 and 2019. While Germany's ICT market is succeeding globally, within the country itself, ICT success is mainly only prevalent in the larger cities.

== Potential solutions ==
Germany differs from most other countries in that the digital divide cannot be significantly attributed to disparities in infrastructure. Generally, rural areas are placed at a much higher price point for high-speed Internet access as opposed to urban areas. However, the German digital divide is regionally affected by attainable benefits of Internet access. The regional differences are not so much due to geographic barriers, but instead revolve around the different subgroups of the population that make up each region. An assessment made through Wikipedia and Twitter reported that minority and regional languages are underrepresented online. Germans of all ages are using more and more social networks in past years, a strong indicator of a diminishing digital divide. From 2010 to 2013, the percentage of German citizens over the age of 65 using social networks increased from 50 percent to 66 percent.

== Effects of the digital divide in Germany ==
Germany is the leading economic nation in Europe and the second most populous European nation. With ICT innovations developed in Germany, the industry has contributed to technological development internationally. Information access is an important factor for society's economic equality, social mobility, political participation, economic growth, and differences between rural and urban areas A digital divide in Germany is present.

Economic growth is based on Germany's productive capacity, measured by the difference of gross national product in a year and its previous year. Principle causes of economic growth include a capital stock increase, technological advances, greater quality of literacy, and recently must take environmental sound into account. According to data provided by Deloitte in 2014, Germany in-store retail sales are influenced 30% by digital technologies, and 15% by web-enabled mobile devices. These technological advances expands the connectivity between online and offline shopping and effects the way society is buying their goods. Social media platforms such as Facebook and YouTube influence young adults, ages 21–24, to spend more money in store than adults, ages greater than 25.

Germany is known to have a moderate level of economic inequality and social mobility. Social mobility in Germany is heading downward, and according Dr. Reinhard Pollak there are four obstacles for upward social mobility. The first is educational upbringing deficits due from parents to their children that impede development in the early years. Another obstacle is the type of school based on low and high social backgrounds of the children and their performance gap between the different classes of the children. The blocking of vocational opportunities on early teens also block upward social mobility. Finally, career paths for adults are minimal due to adequate funding and unclear framework of career opportunities. All of these factors that prevent upward social mobility in Germany hinder proper technological education for children with poor education, and therefore increases the digital divide in Germany.

Political affiliation is a reason for people in Germany to use technology. Before the internet there weren't too many sources of information and now off-liners are concerned about new contents on the internet about the "explicit and radical political contents". Federal and State governments and Germany university politics are in support for improving internet utilization under academic research and teaching conditions. There are two important measures: The Hochschulbauförderungsgesetz (University Support Act) and the Hochschulsonderprogramm III (HSPIII) (University Special Plan III). Financial contribution by the states and federal government are due to the goal of bridging the digital divide in Germany.

Availability and accessibility of education and technology in rural and peripheral areas in Germany measure to be limited compared to urban areas. With government interference, rural and peripheral areas are utilizing internet access through Mobile Internet cafés (MIC) and the Mobile Internet School (MobIS). Internet access and use in rural areas is continuing to grow, but the key is for it to grow quick enough to keep the digital divide between urban and rural areas as small as possible.
