= Digital divide in Thailand =

Differences in access to information technologies

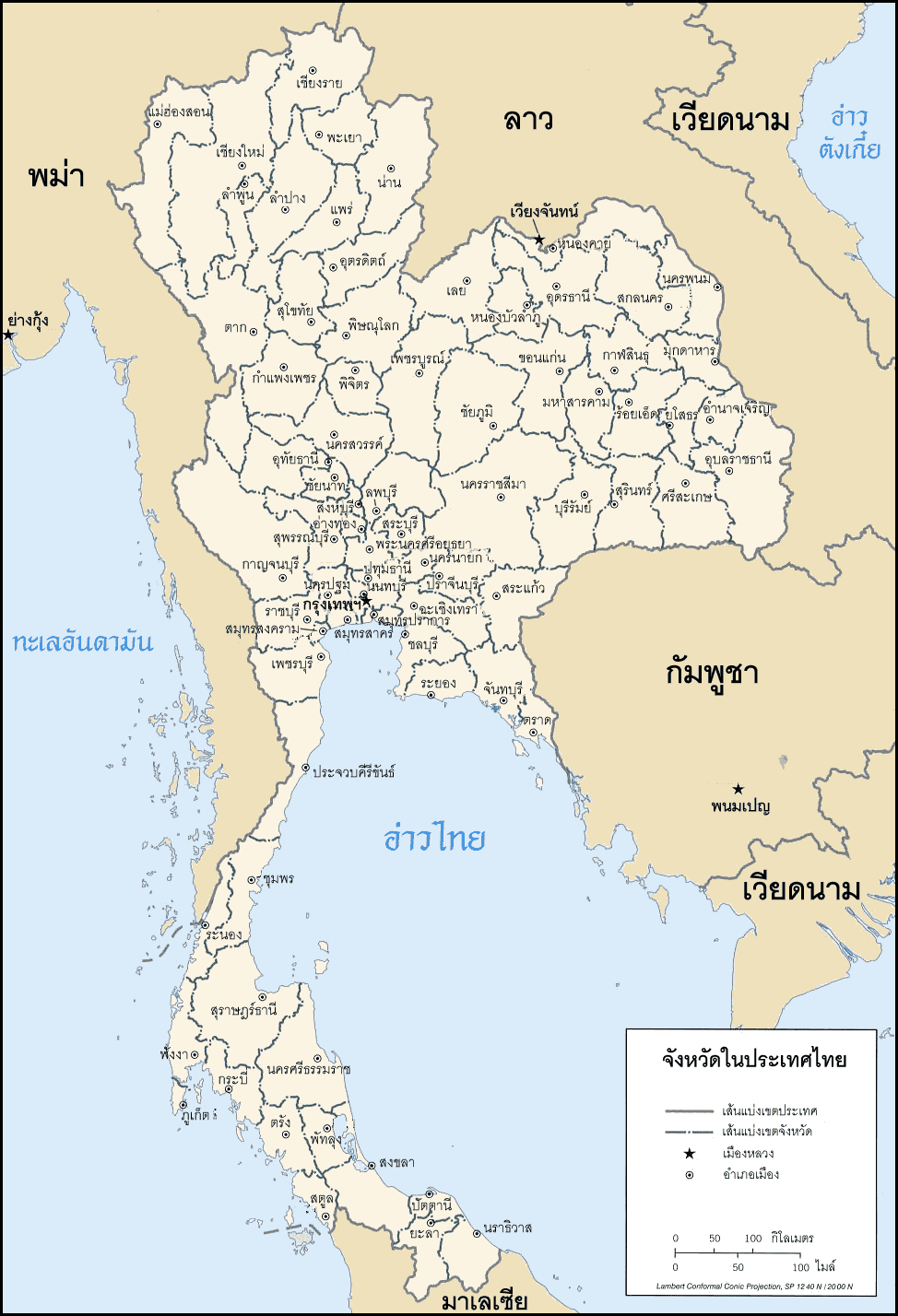

The digital divide in Thailand refers to the economic, educational, and social inequalities between the Thai people who have access to information and communications technology (ICT) and those who do not. Thailand is a developing country within Southeast Asia, and is currently confronted with this problem. There are a number of factors that determine the digital divide within a country, including income, choice of technologies (e.g., owned mobile phone, owned laptop and/or personal computer) and socioeconomic factors (e.g., gender, level of education, age). ICT development and mobile penetration are strongly correlated with economic growth and social benefits.

== Internet access ==
The Ministry of Digital Economy and Society National Statistical Office

=== Mobile internet and wireless technology ===
Before Internet was launched commercially in 1995, there was a very low rate of users in Thailand. Mobile Internet access was first introduced to the Thai market in December 2000 by Advanced Info Service (AIS), the largest nationwide mobile operator. Since 2005, the Internet market has been liberalized. At the end of 2010, there were more than 80 active Internet Service Providers (ISPs). Ten of these are major ISPs, including mobile operators which provide mobile Internet. The price of Internet service is cheaper than it was in the early stage of introduction.

Wireless technology has shifted the world of fixed Internet access to mobile Internet access, thanks to the growing penetration of wireless devices and rapid technological development. Mobile Internet is significantly different from fixed Internet, in terms of mobility and convenience. The two trends that have driven the growth of mobile Internet in Thailand are the introduction of third-generation mobile technology (3G) and improved coverage of mobile infrastructure. At the end of 2009, the mobile penetration rate was 98.58%, while the fixed telephony and Internet penetration rates were 11.12% and 25.80%, respectively. By 2010, the mobile penetration rate reached 100%. The underdevelopment of fixed infrastructure has led to a low fixed Internet penetration rate compared with mobile Internet penetration rate. In 2009 more than 50% of Internet subscribers were broadband subscribers.

=== NTC survey ===
In 2010, the National Telecommunications Commission (NTC) commissioned a nationwide face-to-face, interview-based survey of people in Thailand. The questionnaire consisted of 10 parts: 9 regarding telecommunications and media services such as fixed telephony, mobile telephony, the Internet, public phone, radio, and television, and the rest were about socio-economic backgrounds.

==== Population ====
Survey respondents were selected across each region of Thailand: Bangkok, Central, North, Northeast and South. The sample consisted of two groups of respondents: 1) consumers who accessed mobile Internet as their primary Internet connection, connecting either via a mobile device or USB cards, and 2) consumers with fixed Internet connection as their primary access. All respondents were under 15 years, and non-Internet users and incomplete answers were excluded from the sample. The total sample size after data cleaning was 739 respondents.

==== Findings ====
The characteristics of the survey were compared with the National Statistic Office (NSO) database in 2009. The survey drew data from 9 provinces, and the typical respondent was 30 years old with a bachelor's degree and a monthly income of 12,384.90 THB.

=== Limitations and effects ===
As a developing country, Thailand is confronted with the digital divide both at a national and international level. The underdevelopment of fixed infrastructure has led to a low Internet penetration rate. On the other hand, the mobile penetration rate is higher than fixed in terms of network coverage and subscription. The price of mobile Internet service is inelastic, so an increase in price does not affect the need to access mobile Internet. The price is a result of the lack of competition in fixed connection, which also results in limited choices for consumers.

==== Factors influencing internet access ====
===== Education =====
Internet is readily available at universities for students attending the school. This internet service is available to students, teachers, faculty and staff. Educational software has been developed and available for students attending the university. Wifi is one of the technology services available at universities. Education is largely based from books but schools are now incorporating the internet into their studies. Education is largely biased to the upper class. The upper class has the funds to afford education. This contributes to the digital divide in Thailand from the perspective that the lower class can not afford education and therefore does not have access to the internet.

===== Income =====
Thailand since 1988 has continuously lowered their poverty rate from approximately 34% to 9%. However, there is a disparity among regions in Thailand. Such that the Northeast and North region account for about 40% of the 9% that are in poverty with the whole kingdom accounting for 9 percent. The South, Central and Bangkok combined are less than 9% of the poverty rate. Lower income families cannot afford the luxuries like mobile devices that allow access to the internet. Higher income families have the ability to use extra funds to purchasing Internet and wireless devices that allow access to the Internet.

===== Location =====
Statistics compiled by the National Statistical Office on household utilization of information and communication technology revealed that during 2005-2014, computer users increased steadily in number both in urban and rural areas. In urban areas, computer users rose from 35.5% of the population in 2005 to 47.8% in 2014, while those in rural areas the percentage rose from 19.7% to 30.4% in the same period. However, the gap of urban and rural computer users during this period remained at a relatively wide margin of approximately 15–19%, although this urban-rural gap showed signs of narrowing slightly after 2011.

In urban areas, Internet subscription increased from 21.2% of the population in 2005 to 44.9% in 2014, and in rural areas from 8% to 26.9% However, the gap of urban and rural computer users during this period remained at a relatively wide margin of approximately 13–19%, and this urban-rural gap showed signs of widening further in 2011 mainly due to a projected rise in subscription of mobile Internet services in urban areas.

===== Age =====
In Thailand, the younger generation is heavily populating the universities and schools. This will account for the age gap in internet usage. According to a study conducted in 2006 by Okazaki, affluent youth is the core segment of mobile Internet adoption The older generation is not naturally receptive to the learning of the internet. This will compound on to the age divide of internet usage, and furthermore add to the digital divide in Thailand.

===== Gender =====
According to a study conducted in 2010, the gender divide does not exist in Thailand. Gender has no effect in the digital divide in Thailand. Women and men are fairly even in the education system. This allows both genders to have access to the internet. This creates little to no gender gap in usage of the internet.

=== Solutions ===
To help resolve the digital divide in Thailand, the current companies need to expand and create more affordable options. Mobile Internet should be easily accessible in dense populations and rural areas as well. A more attended and better education system will help resolve the digital divide in Thailand.

==== Investment in infrastructure ====
In 2010, Chalita Srinuan, Ph.D. student, and Erik Bohlin, professor, from the Department of Technology Management and Economics at the Chalmers University of Technology in Göteborg, Sweden, conducted a study investigating the determinant factors that could explain the digital divide phenomena in Thailand. The results show that the availability of a fixed telephone at home, becoming a mobile subscriber and the availability of traditional media are the determinants for using the Internet. The demographic background also affects the probability of using the Internet, for example age, education and area of residence. The results suggest that policies related to infrastructure and education are important to bridge the digital divide. Telecom regulators and government agencies such as the National Regulatory Agency (NRA) need to build telecommunication networks that could adequately serve different regions of Thailand. Investing in fixed/fixed wireless and wireless infrastructure can stimulate the growth of mobile Internet by increasing competition. The Thai government, regulators, and other stakeholders are encouraging the ICT industry to provide communications and services for all by fostering investment and removing regulatory bottlenecks.

==== Mobile internet ====
The benefits of mobile Internet can be seen as offering an alternative for bridging the digital divide, in particular, for a developing country such as Thailand where fixed telephony is not available. The three main conditions for mobile Internet are accessibility, availability and affordability of service and applications, which are all applicable to Thailand. In terms of accessibility and availability, the wireless infrastructure, in particular Wi-Fi hotspots, only provides full coverage in populated areas.

==== Education ====
The results indicate that the digital divide cannot be reduced without an education program. The government controls education system. For the education system to progress, the government needs to invest more money and energy. This will help bridge the digital divide in Thailand.
