= Thérèse Paquet-Sévigny =

Canadian diplomat

- Occupation: Diplomat
- Known for: Under-Secretary-General in the United Nations

Thérèse Paquet-Sévigny is a Canadian diplomat who, in 1987, was the first woman permanently appointed as an Under-Secretary-General in the United Nations. She was head of the Department of Public Information. She has also been the Secretary General and Senior Advisor to Orbicom, the International Network of UNESCO Chairs in Communications.

Paquet-Sévigny was previously a vice-president of communications with the CBC. She has taught at the University of Montreal and was head of the UNESCO chair in International Development and Communication at the Université du Québec à Montréal.
