= Digital divide in Canada =

Differences in access to information technologies

The digital divide in Canada refers to the discrepancy that exists between Canadians who have access to information and communication technologies (ICT) and the benefits they provide compared to those who do not. This divide can be the result of many factors, including high costs for technology and online access, differences in the availability of online connectivity resources in different locations across the country, and lacking digital literacy. The digital divide in Canada also stems from income inequality among Canadians and differences in online practices exhibited by those of different age, gender, first language, and cultural background.

The digital divide is greatest in Northern Canada due to the economic and geographical obstacles to setting up high speed internet connections between distant and sparsely populated towns, along with some residents' low digital literacy rates and lack of access to technology.

Various government initiatives are currently being implemented to reduce the digital divide in Canada, including plans aimed at providing all Canadians with affordable high speed internet packages, increasing the amount of free public Wi-Fi available, and the improvement of digital literacy among students in public elementary and high schools.

== Connectivity gap ==
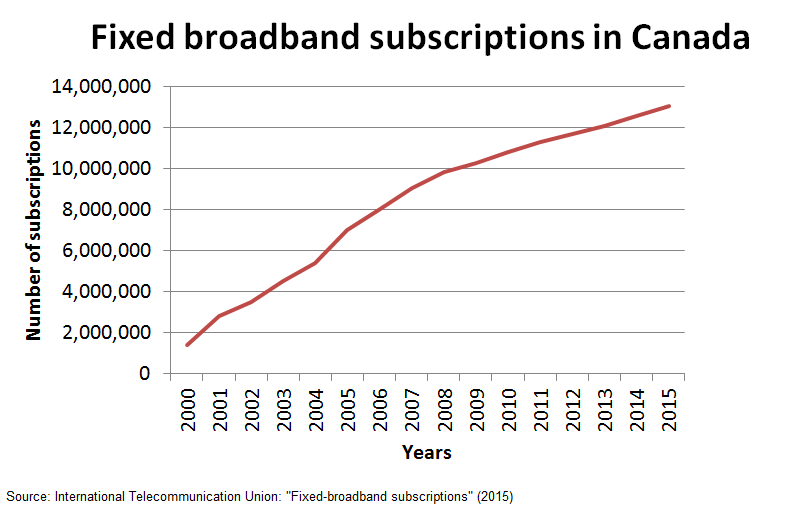
A graph displaying the number of fixed broadband subscriptions in Canada by year.

While 99% of Canadians have access to wireline telephone service, there are still many gaps between the levels of ICT access and internet connectivity that different groups within Canada possess. As of 2015 there are over 13 million fixed broadband subscriptions in Canada, which translates into approximately thirty six subscriptions per one hundred Canadian citizens.

In the past the regulation of telephone and television monopolies in Canada by the Canadian Radio-television and Telecommunications Commission (CRTC) led to the creation of expansive telecommunications networks and made it affordable for customers to connect to them. Broadband's current lack of retail regulation has led to a different market environment emerging for high speed internet access, where internet service providers (ISP) have great control over what prices they charge and what infrastructure they build.

=== Income and price ===
Statistics Canada states that income disparity plays a fundamental role in determining whether or not Canadians are connected online. Findings show that 97.7% of households that reside within the highest income quartile have high speed internet access, while only 58% of households that reside within the lowest income quartile possess access to the internet at home.

A report conducted by Acorn Canada of low and moderate income Canadian families found that 83.5% of respondents believe the monthly cost of high speed internet service in Canada is very expensive. The Canadian Internet Registration Authority reports that in 2015 Canadians paid an average of $38.91 per month for high speed internet service, or an average of $203.04 monthly for all communication services combined. Acorn Canada is currently calling on the CRTC to mandate ISPs to provide a $10 per month high speed internet package in an effort to ensure that at least some form of online access is affordable for all Canadians.

A lack of competition plays a large role in the prices that ISPs charge Canadians for online access. Unlike other countries which allow foreign competition to enter their national markets and keep prices competitive, regulation has forbidden the same from happening within Canada, resulting in fewer online connectivity choices for Canadians and the ability for incumbent ISPs to have a large amount of control over the prices they charge. To compensate for this, the CRTC has allowed for new entrant carriers to enter the broadband market in an attempt to keep prices competitive and increase consumer options regarding where internet access can be purchased from. New entrant carriers such as TekSavvy have been mandated access to incumbent carrier networks, such as those belonging to Rogers and Bell, giving carriers which do not have the capital or resources available to build their own networks an opportunity to compete in the market. Broadband packages offered by new entrant ISPs are generally less expensive than those offered by incumbent ISPs, with many new entrant plans being 20% to 30% cheaper compared to incumbent plans with similar speeds. Many plans offered by new entrant carriers also feature higher data caps, periods during the day when online usage does not contribute to a user's monthly data cap, or in some cases no monthly data cap at all.

Despite efforts by the CRTC to increase competition without allowing the presence of international competitors, Canadian broadband prices have been steadily rising, with the average cost of high speed internet packages rising at three times the rate of inflation since 2010. As online access continues to become more essential to life in Canada, the price elasticity of broadband service has been decreasing, allowing for disproportionate increases in price without the need for incumbent ISPs to fear a significant loss of customers as a result.

Fixed broadband service is not the only area which has seen disproportionate increases in prices, as according to the International Telecommunication Union Canada's mobile sector had the highest average revenue per user in 2010 compared to the mobile markets of all other countries. As of 2015 mobile packages in Canada have an average price of approximately $60 per month with the possibility existing for usage and overage fees if calling, text messaging, or data limits are exceeded. Similar to new entrant carriers in the provision of fixed broadband service, mobile virtual network operators (MVNO) also exist which use incumbent infrastructure to provide mobile services in an attempt to make the market more competitive.

=== Data caps ===
Many high speed internet packages offered in Canada have data caps, or online data consumption limits that when surpassed will result in additional charges being applied to a user's monthly bill. Data caps in Canada can be as low as 20GB, which is over six times lower than the lowest data cap in the United States of 150GB. Data caps contribute to the digital divide by discouraging online usage in users due to the fear of incurring overage charges for any bandwidth consumed once one's data cap has been exceeded. This results in further difficulties for low income families and minority groups regarding being able to afford and make significant use of high speed internet access at home.

Plans offered by new entrant ISPs frequently have higher data caps than those offered by incumbent ISPs, with some new entrant plans offering unlimited bandwidth during times of the day when overall network use is lower. Some plans offered by new entrant carriers also feature no data cap at all, which is something not frequently offered in retail plans provided by incumbent ISPs.

=== Location ===
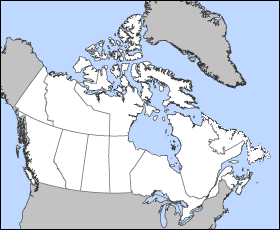
A map highlighting Canada's ten provinces and three territories in white.

While urban areas within Canada have a 100% high speed internet availability rate, rural areas have a lower level of access to high speed internet service with a rate of only 87%. Many locations which do not have access to high speed broadband networks reside within the Northwest Territories, Yukon, and Nunavut where various geographical features create difficulties relating to the development of broadband infrastructure. These development difficulties are compounded by the fact that there exists little incentive for ISPs to build broadband infrastructure in the north due to the high cost and low return of developing in areas where towns and people are greatly dispersed.

Differences can also be found in the quality of networks that Canadians who live in different areas of the country have access to. Those living in urban areas, particularly residents of newly constructed or renovated condominiums, are more likely to have access to fibre to the premises (FTTP) internet connectivity than those in older neighbourhoods, who commonly still connect to the internet through infrastructure that is based at least partially on legacy telephone or cable technologies. As of 2015 Canada ranks 24th out of all countries in terms of FTTP penetration at a level of less than 5%. This lags behind other developed countries such as Japan and South Korea which have national FTTP penetration levels of nearly 70%.

== Demographics and the second level digital divide ==
Aside from monetary factors, demographic differences within Canada have also resulted in disparity regarding online connectivity and ICT use. Variables such as education and age can play a role in what is considered to be the second level digital divide, where even though a person may have access to high speed internet and the ICTs required to connect to it, their ability to make effective use of them is at a disadvantage compared to more educated or digitally literate groups. The digital divide in Canada is no longer just a question of those who have access to ICTs and those who don't, but rather bridging gaps pertaining to the second level digital divide is becoming increasingly important as resources including health care access, government documents, and businesses transition to an online space, meaning that digital literacy and technological understanding will be a key factor in the future for ensuring access to such things.

=== Education ===
The level of education attained by a Canadian citizen plays a role in determining how much one uses the internet. Canadians who have graduated high school are 67% more likely to connect online than those who have not graduated. Canadians who are currently attending school also have an almost five times higher online access rate compared to those without a high school diploma.

Education levels not only determine how frequently Canadian citizens connect online, but also represent how engaged they are in various online activities. Canadians who have graduated high school perform more online activities than those without a high school diploma, and university graduates complete more online activities than those who have only graduated high school. In regards to social networking, current students utilize social media services more frequently than those who are not currently in school, and Canadians with less than a high school diploma use social media more often than university graduates do.

=== Age ===
As of 2013 research has shown that 80% of Canadians (up from 73% in 2007) aged 16 or older are connected to the internet and actively participate online.

Approximately five million people within Canada are 65 years of age or older; this age group shows some of the lowest levels of ICT usage and online engagement due to lacking access and digital literacy. Many elderly Canadians feel disconnected from online issues and discourse, amidst an online population which tends to be composed mostly of younger people. Accessibility issues are another barrier to older Canadians online: for example websites with smaller text are harder for some people to read.

=== Gender ===
In Canada, the gap between men and women who have online access and own ICTs has almost disappeared, but there are still gaps between males and females in their quantity and type of use. Canadian men make more use of the internet overall, performing more online activities and being generally more engaged compared to women. However, women are found to make greater use of social network media, with a 58% higher usage rate compared to men.

=== Language and culture ===
Canada's multilingual nature results in discrepancies between the use that Canadians of different first languages get out of online resources. This was a prominent factor of division during the earlier days of the internet, as there was far less motivation for French Canadians to go online due to a lack of French websites and information available compared to English. As of the 2011 Canada Census, 57% of Canadians speak English as their first language, with 21% speaking French, and 20% speaking a language other than English or French as their first language.

Immigration is another factor which influences the digital divide in Canada: in some Canadian cities over half of the residents are foreign born. Immigrants who have resided in Canada for a fair length of time, as well as Canadian born immigrants, have a 68% higher chance of using the internet compared to recent immigrants.

Plans are currently under way to connect First Nations communities across Canada with high speed internet access. The Government of Canada recently announced $2.2 million in funding to support the Pathways to Technology project in British Columbia, which is focused on connecting "unserved or underserved" First Nations residents in the province with internet connectivity. In Manitoba $4.3 million in Federal funding has been given to the Manitoba First Nations Technology Council to provide high speed internet to all 63 First Nations communities within the province; this will use 3,600 kilometres of fibre optic cable.

== Effects ==
Lacking access to ICTs, satisfactory broadband service, or digital literacy results in a less informed society and puts those who lack access at a disadvantage compared to others, as Canadians are more frequently looking to online sources for news, with social media platforms such as Facebook becoming an increasingly prominent way for people in Canada to consume information. Participation online is also important as it expands the social, cultural, and economic possibilities of those who are active on the internet, as services and resources are increasingly transitioning to online spaces, leaving those without online connectivity with a lack of access to them. Lacking online access and the knowledge or technology to make use of it also effects Canada's economy as a whole, preventing Canadians from the ability to purchase products or services from other Canadians who operate online businesses.

Inadequate knowledge regarding technology is also a growing issue for Canadians as the world becomes more technology and online focused, making the need for digital literacy an increasingly important factor in education and labour, as computers open new opportunities for learning and training.

== Solutions ==
=== Broadband as an essential service ===
Unlike telephone and television provision which are considered essential services within Canada, and are required under Canada's basic service objective to be available to all Canadians regardless of ability to pay for them, broadband internet access does not fall under the same guidelines. It has been proposed in recent years that broadband should be deemed an essential service along with telephone and television, and hearings are currently being held to discuss the feasibility of this idea. At the present time incumbent ISPs disagree with this proposition, claiming that the currently available internet connectivity services offered in all but some rural areas are sufficient to the point of not needing to be regulated by the CRTC.

=== Connecting Canadians ===
A program run by the Government of Canada known as Connecting Canadians is currently undergoing the task of improving Canada's online broadband network access to the point of providing all Canadians with a minimum quality of 5 megabits per second download speed and 1 megabit per second upload speed, target speeds seen by the CRTC as being fast enough to allow sufficient use of the Internet for carrying out essential tasks. This is to be achieved by providing subsidies to ISPs to upgrade and expand networks into rural areas, and aims to supply almost 300,000 households with high speed internet connections by 2019.

=== Public access ===
Locations such as public libraries where a person can connect to the internet for free without the need of owning ICTs or paying for internet access are one way of reducing the gap between those who can participate online and those who cannot.

The city of Toronto is currently partnering with Google in an effort to provide portable Wi-Fi hotspots for Canadians who would not otherwise be able to afford online connectivity. These hotspots can be taken to a user's home for a period of six months and offer 10 gigabytes of usable data per month. They can currently be obtained from six Toronto Public Library locations across the city.

=== Basic service package ===
In 2016 the CRTC mandated television service providers to offer a basic TV package to customers for a maximum price of $25, which can then be expanded upon by purchasing additional channels. The purpose of such a package is to make television service affordable for Canadians who otherwise might not be able to afford a package that includes various extra or undesired channels. The same has been proposed to be done for broadband service by having the CRTC determine a sufficient service quality of fixed price that ISPs will be mandated to offer to customers. As low cost internet connectivity options in Canada have been disappearing in favour of mid to high level packages priced at an average of around $50, it is believed that such regulation would contribute to the narrowing of the digital divide within Canada for those who lack sufficient access due to monetary reasons.

=== Improvement of digital literacy ===
The improvement of digital literacy among Canadians has the potential to shrink the divide between citizens who make frequent use of ICTs and online resources, and those who do not. It is being recommended that Canada adapt a digital literacy strategy similar to those of countries such as the United States and Australia, so that children start to learn to use technology efficiently and safely as early as kindergarten, and they improve such digital skills throughout compulsory education until grade 12. As education systems in Canada are controlled at the provincial level it is difficult for the Federal government to implement digital literacy guidelines for schools, even though an improvement in digital literacy would benefit all of Canada, making the strategy a Federal issue.

ICT use is also creating a method to give people the skills required to operate in a world with a constantly evolving digital landscape. 99% of business establishments in Canada are classed as small or medium-sized enterprises; increased digital literacy would ensure that such businesses can make use of the internet, and thus can better serve customers and remain competitive in the global market.

== See also ==
- Digital divide
- Digital divide in the United States
- Open access in Canada to scholarly communication
