= Ofelia Garcia =

Ofelia Garcia may refer to:

- Ofelia Garcia (artist), Cuban-born American artist
- Ofelia García (educator), linguist
