= Ophelia Paquet =

Tillamook woman in Oregon in interracial marriage

Ophelia (Catata) Paquet was a Tillamook woman involved in an Oregon court case in 1919 related to the legal recognition of marriage across racial lines. The case's issue was whether Ophelia Paquet could inherit her deceased Euro-American husband's estate in the state of Oregon. Her case exemplifies the role that marriage has in the transmission of property and how race can affect gender complications.

== Oregon anti-interracial marriage laws ==
At the time of the case, the state of Oregon had a law stating that Euro-Americans could not marry people who were by ancestry more than one-fourth of African, Chinese or Kanaka (a term at the time largely only used to describe anyone in the Pacific Northwest), or more than half of Native American descent. The law defined interracial marriage as illicit. Also with the preconceived notion that people of non-European descent were hypersexual. The anti-interracial marriage laws of the United States generally tended to prohibit interracial marriage rather than interracial sex. Marriage brought economic and social benefits to couples. Anti-interracial marriage laws were designed to keep people of color from rising up in socio-economic status.

== Case ==
The case was decided in Oregon Supreme Court over the inheritance of the estate of a deceased Euro-American man Fred Paquet to his Tillamook wife Ophelia Paquet. Fred and Ophelia Paquet were married for more than thirty years. The issue was whether the Court would recognize the Paquet's marriage. The Court concluded that the marriage violated Oregon's anti-interracial marriage law. The estate was ruled to be transferred to Fred Paquet's relative John Paquet. The judges were somewhat sympathetic to Mrs. Paquet because of how faithful she was to Fred for over thirty years. There were arguments that Paquet should get half of the estate. In the end, Pacquet should have received a settlement on the basis that she clears her claims of ownership of the estate. It was not clear whether Pacquet agreed upon and received the settlement.

== Significance of the case ==
Ophelia Paquet's case brought attention to the connection between race and the transmission of property. Anti-interracial marriage laws kept property within racial bounds by only validating marriages between Euro-American men and Euro-American women and invalidating marriages between Euro-American men and women designated as being of other races. Interracial marriages were not recognized by the anti-inter-racial marriage laws. Race can be seen as property within the context of miscegenation laws. To keep property in the hands of Whites and prevent non-Whites from gaining property.

The case also raised attention to how women were economically dependent on men. Women were perceived to be dependent on men during the early twentieth century. Ophelia Paquet's case dispelled that. Her husband Fred was away from the estate a lot and her wage work provided a lot of the income for the estate.
