= Orbicom-UNESCO =

Orbicom is a global academic network founded in 1994 under the aegis of UNESCO, bringing together academics and communication and media professionals, with the aim of stimulating the exchange of information and the development of joint projects, in order to examine how this constantly evolving field can contribute to promoting democracy and sustainable development. Its head office is based in Montreal, Canada.

This network, which is at the crossroads of teaching, research and professional practices, was created jointly in May 1994 by UNESCO and Université du Québec à Montréal (UQAM - Canada). It currently comprises more than 60 UNESCO Research Chairs in Communication and about 280 members from many countries in all regions of the world, for example in South Africa, Germany, Australia, Brazil, Bulgaria, Canada, China, Colombia, Spain, United States, France, Hungary, India, Lithuania, Mexico, Peru, Russia, Uruguay.

The first mission of the Orbicom network is to “develop and promote the sharing of knowledge and expertise in communication through education, research and concrete action". It also aims to focus on development-related communication issues, including bilateral and multilateral aid policies, national policies and communication laws.

Linking specialists around the world working in different communication sectors, and supported by international institutions, media, governments and businesses, it is part of UNESCO's new communication strategy, unanimously adopted at the 1989 General Conference.

The "Orbicom" association, bringing together UNESCO chairs in communication, has been chaired since 2018 by Professor Jamal Eddine Naji, a Moroccan academic. Members meet at conferences held annually in various countries.

External links

- Official Web site of Orbicom
- Mission and Mandates
- UNESCO Chairs Members of Orbicom
- Governing Body
