= Digital inclusion =

Digital media accessibility

Digital inclusion involves the activities necessary to ensure equitable access to and use of information and communications technologies for participation in social and economic life including for education, social services, health, social, and community participation. Digital inclusion includes access to affordable broadband Internet services, Internet-enabled devices, access to digital literacy training, quality technical support, and applications and online content designed to enable and encourage self-sufficiency, participation, and collaboration. Related concepts include digital divide, digital exclusion and digital inequality, however digital inclusion focuses more on the strategies, policies, and programs required to address the digital divide.

As many services have moved online and with the increasing use of telehealth to deliver primary care, particularly during the COVID-19 pandemic in 2020, digital inclusion, including digital literacy and internet access is increasingly regarded as a social determinant of health. Accessibility, relevance, and impact have been identified as essential elements of digital inclusion as it pertains to health information systems.

"Digital inclusion is broadly defined as different strategies designed to ensure that all people have equal access, opportunities and skills to benefit from digital technologies and systems" (ITU, 2019, as cited in Carmi and Yates, 2020).

Since 2020, there have been many technology companies that have begun implementing different features or roles within their companies to support breaking down the digital divide. For example, HP has announced the digital divide accelerator. This accelerator will support nonprofits in Greece, Indonesia, Nigeria, and Spain. The goal for this role is to help equip children and other people within the community to understand the skills needed to become a part of the digital community.

== Background ==
With the increasing use of computers and the Internet in the 1990s and early 2000s concerns rose around digital equality, however this primarily focused on the physical access to technology. This gave rise to the concept of the digital divide which was originally developed to describe the growing disparity in Internet access between rural and urban areas of the United States of America. This gradually expanded to considerations of digital access between countries in what is termed the global digital divide, which mirrors many of the disparities seen within countries but on an international scale. However, with the adoption of digital technologies across most sectors of society, and the increasing diversity of technologies and programs, access and use of ICT became more complex and essential for many aspects of daily life. This led to new terminology and a second wave of research on digital inequality which has been identified as the (1) usage gap, (2) second level digital divide, (3) emerging digital differentiation, and (4) digital inclusion.

== Strategies for digital inclusion ==
A review of the literature in 2019 found that while physical access to digital technologies and the internet continues to be a barrier to digital inclusion, digital ability and attitude were also potential barriers. Key strategies identified for improving digital inclusion are social support, direct user experience and collaborative learning/design.

Education is a key aspect of digital inclusion as digital technologies have become a key means of engaging with all levels of the education system, requiring levels of digital competence for successful engagement with the curriculum. In addition lifelong learning is required as technologies, services and systems are changing constantly. Public libraries and community service providers play a key role in supporting digital inclusion through access to computers, internet connection and expertise and training. Designing for digital inclusion may also help with poor written literacy, which remains a barrier for 10% of the world's population. UNESCO has developed Guidelines for designing digital technologies in ways that could assist those who are illiterate.

== Indigenous digital inclusion ==
Digital inclusion is a critical issue for many Indigenous communities across the globe, many of whom lack access to adequate resources.

The Australian Government has set a National Closing the Gap target for Aboriginal and Torres Strait Islander people to have equal levels of digital inclusion by 2026.

Many people on tribal land and in Native Hawaiian land struggle with the technology gap. The Native Entities Capacity and Planning Grant Program has $45.3 million available to help address these challenges and empower Indian Tribes, Alaska Native entities, and Native Hawaiian organizations. Some of the impacts so far are in the education and workforce development and healthcare access through telehealth.[13]

== Measuring digital inclusion ==
The Australian Digital Inclusion Index (ADII) is a research project which has been tracking digital inclusion throughout Australia since 2016. It uses survey data to measure digital inclusion across three dimensions of access, affordability and digital ability.

== The Future of Digital Inclusion ==
On February 16, 2021, a global dialogue within the United Nations (UN) took a look at the future of digital inclusion. Through the adoption of the 2030 UN Agenda for Sustainable Development, Member States made a commitment. They pledged to "leave no one behind."

By 2030, the UN's goal is to close the digital divide by providing access to the Internet and mobile technologies for all nations and peoples and for all segments of society.

The UN sees the crisis of too many people in our global society still living unconnected and how the digital divide remains a challenge that must be addressed.

== Gaming ==
The Xbox Adaptive Controller is a groundbreaking example of digital inclusion, designed to make gaming more accessible to people with limited mobility. Developed by Microsoft, it features large programmable buttons and ports that connect to a wide range of external devices like switches, joysticks, and mounts, allowing users to customize their gaming experience based on their unique needs. By removing traditional physical barriers to gameplay, the Xbox Adaptive Controller empowers more people to participate in digital entertainment, promotes equal access to technology, and fosters a more inclusive gaming community.

== Digital inclusion advocacy groups ==
- Australian Digital Inclusion Alliance
- National Digital Inclusion Alliance (US)

== See also ==
- Digital equity
