= Ndia =

Ndia or NDIA may refer to:

- Ndia Constituency, Kirinyaga District, Central Province, Kenya
- Alternative name for the Southern Kirinyaga dialect of the Kikuyu language
- National Defense Industrial Association, an American trade association
- National Digital Inclusion Alliance, an American non-profit organization
- Hamad International Airport, an airport in Qatar, formerly known as New Doha International Airport
- N.D.Ia., an abbreviation used for the United States District Court for the Northern District of Iowa

== See also ==
- India
