= Digital intelligence =

Digital intelligence is the sum of social, emotional, and cognitive abilities that enable individuals to face the challenges and adapt to the demands of life in the digital world. An emerging intelligence fostered by human interaction with information technology, it has been suggested that recognition of this intelligence will expand the scope of teaching and learning in the 21st century and all aspects of one's personal and professional lives.

The term is also used in businesses to refer to the information obtained through technologies and making use of them as an online marketing strategy and intelligence in the context of cyber security such as that mapped out by Global Commission on Internet Governance. Digital intelligence in this article refers to a new type of intelligence as a human capacity that combines knowledge, ways of knowing and the ability to interact effectively in a cultural or community setting.

== Definition ==
Digital intelligence or digital intelligence quotient (DQ) has been defined as "a comprehensive set of technical, cognitive, meta-cognitive, and socio-emotional competencies that are grounded in universal moral values and that enable individuals to face the challenges and harness the opportunities of digital life" by DQ Institute. DQ does not merely refer to the skills needed to use technology more effectively or being aware of potential dangers for children who are constantly online. According to DQ Institute, DQ is all-encompassing in that it covers all areas of individuals' digital life that ranges from personal and social identities of individuals to their use of technology, their practical, operational and technical capabilities critical for daily digital lives and careers and the potential safety and security issues in this digital age.

DQ is important in today's world as everything is technologically driven; if people do not develop a certain level of digital intelligence, they will be precluded from an increasingly digital world. As such, it is said to be essential to develop digital intelligence from an early age. DQ is also viewed to be measureable and highly learnable.

== Framework ==
Rather than being defined as the commonly accepted form of intelligence, DQ could be understood more in line with the multiple intelligences theory by Gardner; it might be akin to a "meta-intelligence – one that is composed of many constituent intelligences".

In the same way that intelligence quotient (IQ) and emotional intelligence (EQ) measure general and emotional intelligences, digital intelligence quotient (DQ) can be further deconstructed into eight key areas: digital identity, digital rights, digital literacy, digital use, digital communication, digital safety, digital emotional intelligence, and digital security. Given that "respect" is a fundamental moral principle of the Universal Declaration of Human Rights (UDHR), the guiding principles of an individual's digital life within the eight DQ areas are respect for: oneself, time and the environment, life, property, others, reputation and relationships, knowledge and rights.

Within these eight areas, there are three levels of maturity:

- Level 1 – Digital citizenship: the ability to use digital technology in safe, responsible and ethical ways.
- Level 2 – Digital creativity: the ability to become part of the digital ecosystem and to create new knowledge, technologies and content to turn ideas into reality.
- Level 3 – Digital competitiveness: the ability to solve global challenges, and to create new opportunities in the digital economy by driving entrepreneurship, jobs, growth and impact.

As such, there are 24 digital competencies consisting of various knowledge, skills, attitudes and values.

In addition, DQ further suggests there are eight key digital citizenship competencies for children. They are digital citizen identity, screen time management, digital footprint management, cyber bullying management, digital empathy, privacy management, critical thinking, and cyber security management.

It has been suggested that young learners need to be armed with these competencies, rooted in universal moral values, in order to be good digital citizens and "help them make informed choices and navigate the digital world safely". The efficacy of the DQ Digital Citizenship framework was researched and developed through the development of DQworld.net, a digital media platform that aims to teach and assess children on digital citizenship, moral character and critical thinking and was awarded two UNESCO prizes.

The DQ framework was developed by DQ Institute and has been agreed upon by OECD Education 2030 and IEEE Standards Association as a benchmark for global alignment in September 2018. The DQ framework is said to encompass the knowledge, skills, attitudes and values needed by individuals to thrive successfully in this digital world and be confident in meeting the challenges and demands of the digital era, and is the aggregation from 25 leading global frameworks. It is also built on the OECD's Education 2030 Learning Framework to create a guide for nations to develop their national education and policies on digital intelligence and is adaptable as the technological world evolves.

Apart from this, there is currently no other structural model of DQ based on the definition of DQ as a human capability. So far, only the citizenship level test, known as DQWorld.net, has been developed.

While DQ may be criticized, in terms of it not really being any intelligence, the DQ framework "reflects very well the areas that can be reliably claimed to find their reflection in school curricula", which includes areas essential for present and future life.

=== Measurement and assessment ===
Measuring digital intelligence can be done by means of questionnaires or assessment scales that assess various aspects of digital skills. Questionnaires measuring digital intelligence can measure several aspects of digital skills such as digital identity, digital literacy, digital safety, and digital security.

Li et al. (2024) developed and validated a 22-item scale measuring digital intelligence among primary school pupils in China. Seven dimensions were included in the scale: digital identity, digital use, digital safety, digital security, digital emotional intelligence, digital literacy, and digital rights. To validate the scale, data from 1,109 pupils were analyzed using exploratory and confirmatory factor analysis.

In another study, Na-Nan, Roopleam, and Wongsuwan (2020) developed a digital intelligence quotient questionnaire for employees of small and medium-sized enterprises in Thailand. The questionnaire covered the following dimensions: digital identity, digital use, digital safety, digital security, digital emotional intelligence, digital communication, digital literacy, and digital rights. This questionnaire has been analyzed using exploratory and confirmatory factor analysis.

These studies show how it is possible to create assessments of digital intelligence for various groups of people. These tests were created for a particular population, such as Chinese primary schoolchildren and Thai employees. Their findings might not have equal applicability to any other population. The research concerning the assessment of digital competence also stressed the significance of assessing the reliability and validity of assessment instruments.

== History ==
Digital intelligence quotient (DQ) was first coined and its framework created in 2016 by Yuhyun Park. It was developed by the research team based at various universities, including Nanyang Technological University, the National Institute of Education in Singapore, and Iowa State University. The concept and structure was published by the World Economic Forum in 2016 and since then, the DQ framework has been widely used by organizations from a myriad of industries locally and internationally.

== International recognition ==
=== Coalition for Digital Intelligence (CDI) ===
In September 2018, the Coalition for Digital Intelligence (CDI) – formed by IEEE Standards Association, the DQ Institute and the Organisation for Economic Cooperation and Development (OECD) – institutionalized the DQ framework by DQ Institute as a global framework for digital intelligence which includes a common set of definitions, language, and understanding of comprehensive digital literacy and skills that can be adopted by nations worldwide.

=== DQ Day ===
In the effort to coordinate worldwide efforts in setting global standards for DQ, the inaugural DQ Day was launched on 10 October 2019 by DQ Institute and IEEE SA. According to Yuhyun Park, setting global standards for digital intelligence "is to ensure that everyone around the world, starting with our children, has equal opportunity to thrive in this digital age'. IEEE SA adds, "a global standard that sets common indicators for more comprehensively and collectively understanding the existing challenges that digital skill-promoting efforts face and a common language is foundational to ensuring that digital literacy and competency efforts are coordinated globally and moving the right direction".

=== IEEE process ===
The DQ framework was identified as the best practice to be used as a global industry standard for digital skills by the IEEE Digital Literacy Industry Connections program and there is an initiation of preliminary work under IEEE SA to develop an IEEE global standard for Digital Literacy, Skills and Readiness using the DQ framework.

== Adoption and implementation ==
=== DQ Group story ===
The DQ Institute was born through a project named Shaping Future Implications of Digital Media for Society in association with the World Economic Forum, having identified the need for improved digital media literacy or "digital intelligence (DQ)" across various demographics and more critically in youth. The institute is a multi-stakeholder consortium of organizations focused on increasing DQ in youth around the world and has been the driving force in launching the Coalition for Digital Intelligence (CDI).

This community-led initiative is tasked with evangelizing the institute's DQ framework across the public education and private ICT sectors as the single framework of reference, which is to be used as (i) a common source of definitions around digital skills and literacy, and (ii) a capacity building and DQ measurement platform. The programs based on the DQ framework are poised to be rolled out by DQ Institute to more than 100 countries by 2020. The primary target will be schools and education ministries in countries experiencing rapid digital transformations. The goal is to help governments understand the level of digital citizenship among students and teachers and to help them develop their own DQ curriculum within three years. The DQ Institute has joined forces with some big organizations, including Google, Twitter and the United Nations children's charity UNICEF, and it has received government funding from Singapore and Mexico.

=== DQ Every Child ===
DQ Every Child (#DQEveryChild) is a global digital citizenship movement seeking to empower every child worldwide with DQ digital citizenship. It makes use of an online gamified platform to educate and assess children with digital citizenship skills based on the DQ framework. #DQEveryChild was created as a research-based social initiative developed in Singapore through a multi-stakeholder collaboration including Nanyang Technological University, Singtel, the Singapore government, and infollutionZERO in Korea. It has since transformed into a global movement – run by the DQ Institute – an international coalition formed through the World Economic Forum.

Since then, #DQEveryChild reached numerous countries such as Korea through the support of UNICEF, Nigeria through World Economic Forum, Turkey through Turkcell, Singapore through the Ministry of Education and Singtel, Mexico through the Ministry of Public Education, India and others. As of 2019, the #DQEveryChild initiative has reached more than 700,000 children in 107 countries and has been translated into 21 languages.

=== DQ Global Standards ===
Based on the DQ framework, the DQ Global Standards Report 2019 was launched on 22 March 2019 at the seventh annual Global Education and Skills Forum (GESF). The report was spearheaded by Dr Yuhyun Park and co-authored by Professor Douglas Gentile of Iowa State University. It is the world's first attempt to define a global standard for digital literacy, skills and readiness across the education and technology sectors and establish a global, common language and set of norms around the digital competencies. The OECD, the Forum, the World Bank, and the United Nations have all identified these digital competencies in the DQ framework as fundamental for future readiness.

The DQ Global Standards is the culmination of the successful collaboration across global public, private, and civic education and technology communities that began with the launch of the CDI at the Sustainable Impact Summit, the World Economic Forum in September 2019.

== Criticisms ==
There are concerns over complacency in that if a child is noted to have high DQ, it might be treated as a substitute for parental control.

Whitney DeCamp, a sociologist at Western Michigan University in Kalamazoo, suggests that "the DQ categories are too broad, so less-risky behaviours are lumped into the same category as more-harmful ones."
