= Digital equity =

Condition of equitable access to information technology

Digital equity is the condition in which individuals and communities have the information technology capacity needed to participate in society, the economy, civic life, and to access services. The term is related to, but distinct from, the digital divide, which refers to gaps in access to, use of, or benefits from information and communications technology, and digital inclusion, which refers to activities used to address those gaps.

The United States-based National Digital Inclusion Alliance defines digital equity as a condition in which all individuals and communities have the information technology capacity needed for participation in society, democracy and the economy, including civic and cultural participation, employment, lifelong learning, and access to services. The term is also referred to as digital opportunity.

== Concept ==
Digital equity is used in public policy, education, workforce development, health care, and community planning to describe whether people can use digital technology in ways needed for daily life. It includes access to internet service, appropriate devices, digital literacy, technical support, accessible online content, and knowledge of online privacy and cybersecurity practices.

Research on the digital divide has shifted from a focus on physical access to technology toward differences in skills, uses, and outcomes. Jan van Dijk described digital divide research as involving access to digital media, usage, digital literacy, and links between digital technology and social inequality. Eszter Hargittai's work on the "second-level digital divide" examined differences in online skills among internet users rather than only whether people had internet access.

== Components ==
Digital equity programs often address several related barriers. These include the availability and affordability of fixed or wireless broadband, access to internet-enabled devices, digital literacy training, technical support, online privacy and cybersecurity awareness, and access to online content that supports participation and self-sufficiency.

The National Digital Inclusion Alliance describes digital inclusion as including affordable broadband internet service, internet-enabled devices that meet user needs, digital literacy training, technical support, and applications and online content that enable self-sufficiency, participation, and collaboration.

== United States policy ==
In the United States, the Digital Equity Act of 2021 was enacted as part of the Infrastructure Investment and Jobs Act. The act defines digital equity as the condition in which individuals and communities have the information technology capacity needed for participation in the society and economy of the United States.

The act defines "covered populations" to include individuals in low-income households, aging individuals, incarcerated individuals other than those in federal correctional facilities, veterans, individuals with disabilities, individuals with a language barrier, members of racial or ethnic minority groups, and individuals who primarily reside in rural areas. The U.S. Census Bureau and the National Telecommunications and Information Administration have used data on covered populations, broadband availability, and broadband adoption for Digital Equity Act funding formulas and local planning tools.

State digital equity plans under the act are required to identify barriers faced by covered populations and include objectives related to broadband availability and affordability, online accessibility of public services, digital literacy, online privacy and cybersecurity, and consumer devices and technical support.

== Local and state planning ==
Digital equity planning can combine federal data, local surveys, community engagement and information about broadband service, devices, and digital skills. In Detroit, Data Driven Detroit worked with the City of Detroit on a 2025 digital equity project that used focus groups, a data advisory board, primary survey data, speed test data, device data, and employment-skills data. The project reported that nearly 150 Neighborhood Vitality Index survey respondents had neither broadband nor mobile internet access at home, that residents raised concerns about privacy and parental control in relation to free Wi-Fi, and that basic digital skills such as printing, scanning and using virtual meeting platforms were needs within the community.

Louisiana uses the term "digital opportunity" in its statewide planning. ConnectLA describes Louisiana's Digital Opportunity Plan as centered on four components: internet, devices, applications, and digital skills. The plan describes digital opportunity work as including broadband expansion, digital literacy training, job creation, affordability, and accessibility.

== See also ==
- Broadband
- Digital divide
- Digital inclusion
- Digital literacy
- Internet access
- Media literacy
- Universal service
