= Digital literacy =

Competency in using digital technology

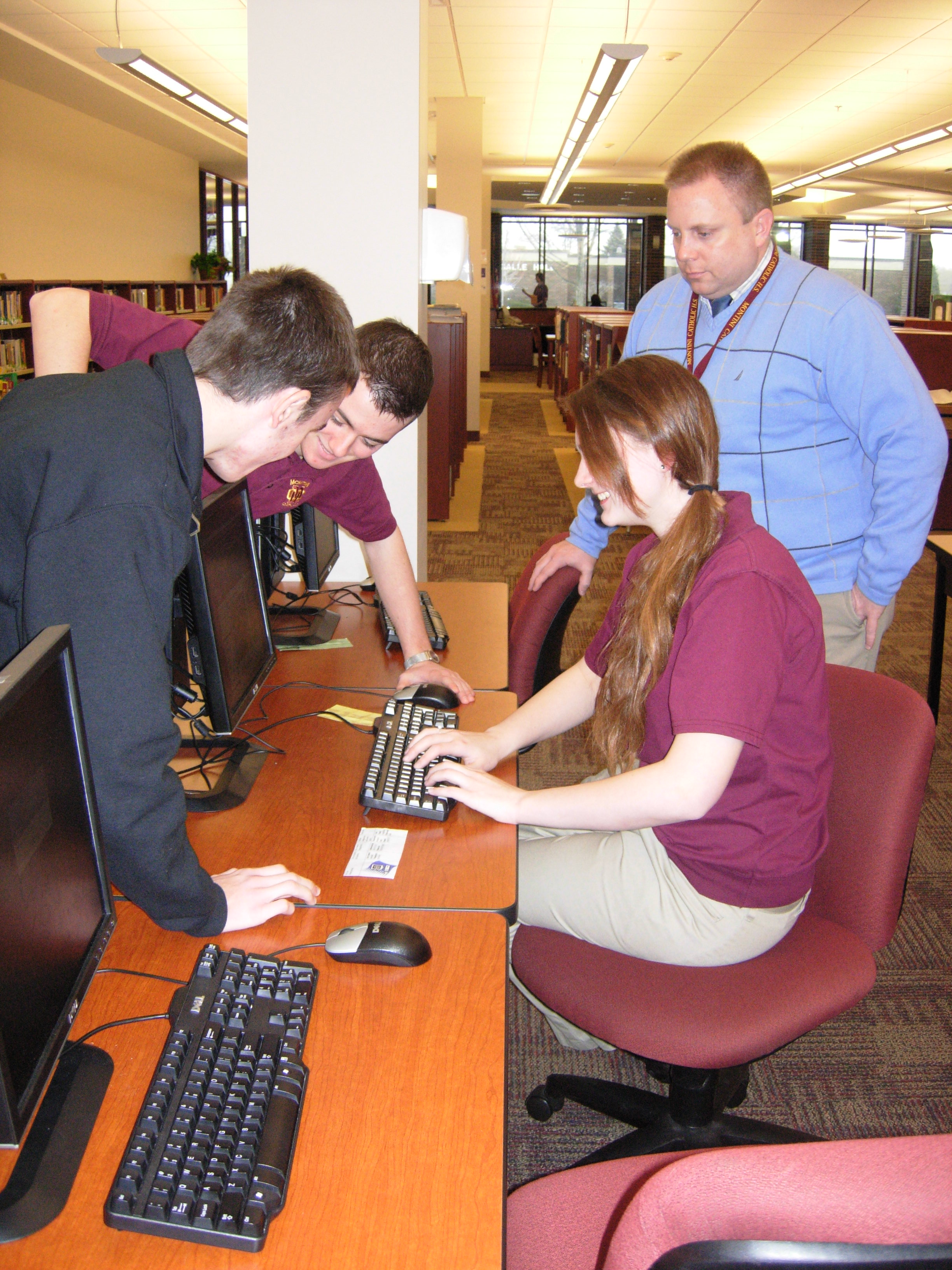
A teacher and his students in a computer lab

Digital literacy is an individual's ability to find, evaluate, and communicate information using digital devices or digital media platforms, as well as the ability to navigate, evaluate, create, and communicate information in digital environments. Digital literacy combines technical and cognitive abilities; it includes using information and communication technologies to create, evaluate, and share information, and critically examining their social and political impacts.

Digital literacy initially focused on digital skills and stand-alone computers, but the advent of the internet and social media use has shifted some of its focus to mobile devices.

Digital literacy is related to, but different from, other forms of literacy. Information literacy focuses on the ability to locate, evaluate, and utilize information through numerous formats. Media literacy refers to the ability to analyze and interpret media messages and their influence. In contrast, digital literacy integrates these competencies while also including the practical use of digital tools, participation in online environments, and the creation of digital content. This broader scope highlights the interactive and participatory nature of digital spaces. While media literacy and information literacy can play a role in one's digital literacy, digital literacy refers to the digital platforms and the way information and messages are interpreted and conveyed.

== History ==
Digital literacy was first defined in a book published in 1997 by Paul Gilster. Gilster referred to digital literacy as the ability to understand and use information in multiple formats from a wide range of sources when it is presented via computers. Since this definition, digital technology has evolved, allowing the true definition of digital literacy to evolve as well. While digital literacy is not limited to computers, it does recognize digital technologies as a medium of messages that require specific literacies to understand, interpret, separate truth from fiction, and allow new meanings to be constructed.

Research into digital literacies draws from traditions of information literacy and research into media literacy which rely on socio-cognitive traditions, as well as research into multimodal composition, which relies on anthropological methodologies. Digital literacy is built on the expanding role of social science research in the field of literacy as well as on concepts of visual literacy, computer literacy, and information literacy.

The concept of digital literacy has evolved throughout the 20th and into the 21st centuries from a technical definition of skills and competencies to a broader comprehension of interacting with digital technologies.

Digital literacy is often discussed in the context of its precursor, media literacy. Media literacy education began in the United Kingdom and the United States due to war propaganda in the 1930s and the rise of advertising in the 1960s, respectively. Manipulative messaging and the increase in various forms of media further concerned educators. Educators began to promote media literacy education to teach individuals how to judge and assess the media messages they were receiving. The ability to critique digital and media content allows individuals to identify biases and evaluate messages independently. Both digital and media literacy include the ability to examine and comprehend the meaning of messages, judge credibility, and assess the quality of a digital work.

With the rise of file sharing on services such as Napster an ethics element began to get included in definitions of digital literacy. Frameworks for digital literacy began to include goals and objectives such as critically examining the political dimensions and power dynamics embedded in processes of digitization or datafication; as well as understanding the importance of becoming a socially responsible member of their community by spreading awareness and helping others find digital solutions at home, work, or on a national platform.

Digital literacy may also include the production of multimodal texts. This definition refers more to reading and writing on a digital device but includes the use of any modes across multiple mediums that stress Semiotic meaning beyond graphemes. It also involves knowledge of producing other types of media, like recording and uploading video.

Overall, digital literacy shares many defining principles with other fields that use modifiers in front of the term "literacy" to define ways of being and domain-specific knowledge or competence. The term has grown in popularity in education and higher education settings and is used in both international and national standards.

== Academic and pedagogical concepts ==
The pedagogy of digital literacy has begun to move across disciplines. In academia, digital literacy is part of the computing subject area alongside computer science and information technology, while some literacy scholars have argued for expanding the framing beyond information and communication technologies into literacy education overall.

Similar to other evolving definitions of literacy that recognize the cultural and historical ways of making meaning, digital literacy does not replace traditional methods of interpreting information but rather extends the foundational skills of these traditional literacies. Scholars have argued that digital literacy should be considered a part of the path towards acquiring knowledge.

The current model of digital literacy explores six skills listed below.

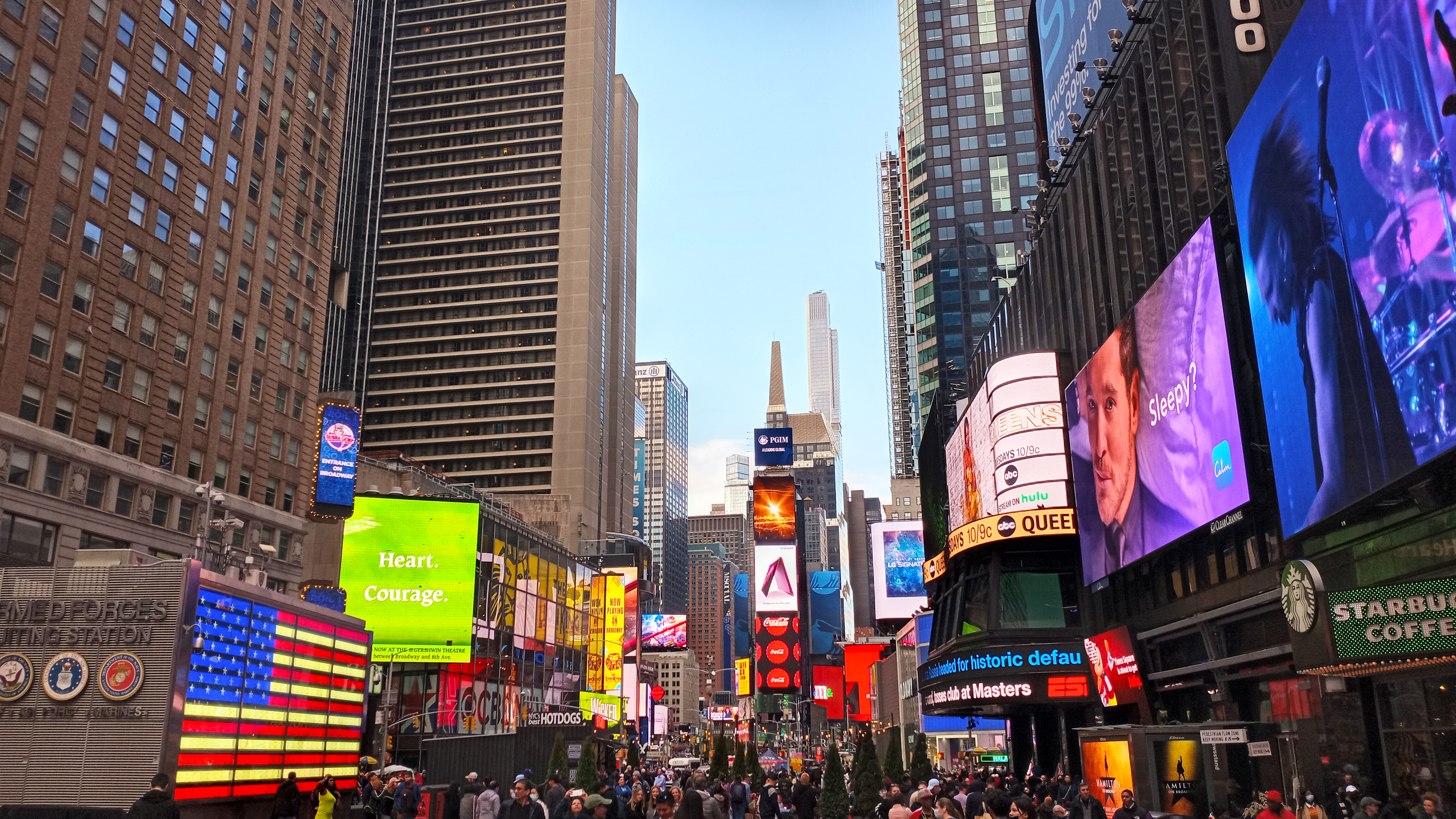
Photo-visual literacy skills can be put into practice by analyzing the visual elements of the images and billboards, understanding the context in which they are presented, evaluating their credibility and reliability, and making decisions based on that information.

1. Reproduction literacy: the ability to use digital technology to create a new piece of work or combine existing pieces of work to make it unique and applicable to personal understanding.
2. Photo-visual literacy: the ability to read and deduce information from visuals.
3. Branching literacy: the ability to successfully navigate in the non-linear medium of digital space.
4. Information literacy: the ability to search, locate, assess and critically evaluate information found on the web and on-shelf in libraries, including validity of that information
5. Socio-emotional literacy: the social and emotional aspects of being present online, whether it may be through socializing, and collaborating, or simply consuming content.
6. Real-time thinking: the ability to process large volumes of stimuli at the same time

=== Artificial intelligence (AI) ===
Digital literacy skills continue to develop with the rapid advancements of artificial intelligence (AI) technologies in the 21st century. AI technologies are designed to simulate human intelligence through the use of complex systems such as machine learning algorithms, natural language processing, and robotics.

The introduction of AI presents a new media platform that requires the skill of digital literacy. Learning how to use Artificial Intelligence comfortably, in a productive manner, is part of that literacy, but does not make it up entirely. Digital literacy does not simply refer to the use of these technologies, but rather the practices, attitudes, and behaviors that it supports. Using Artificial Intelligence in practice, as a way of conveying and receiving information, separating truth from false, or creating new meanings and ideas, is an example of digital literacy.

As these technologies emerge, so have different attempts at defining AI literacy - the ability to understand the basic techniques and concepts behind AI in different products and services. Many framings leverage existing digital literacy frameworks and apply an AI lens to the skills and competencies. Common elements of these frameworks include:

- Know and understand: know the basic functions of AI and how to use AI applications
- Use and apply: applying AI knowledge, concepts and applications in different scenarios
- Evaluate and create: higher-order thinking skills (e.g., evaluate, appraise, predict, design)
- Ethical issues: considering fairness, accountability, transparency, and safety with AI

== In society ==
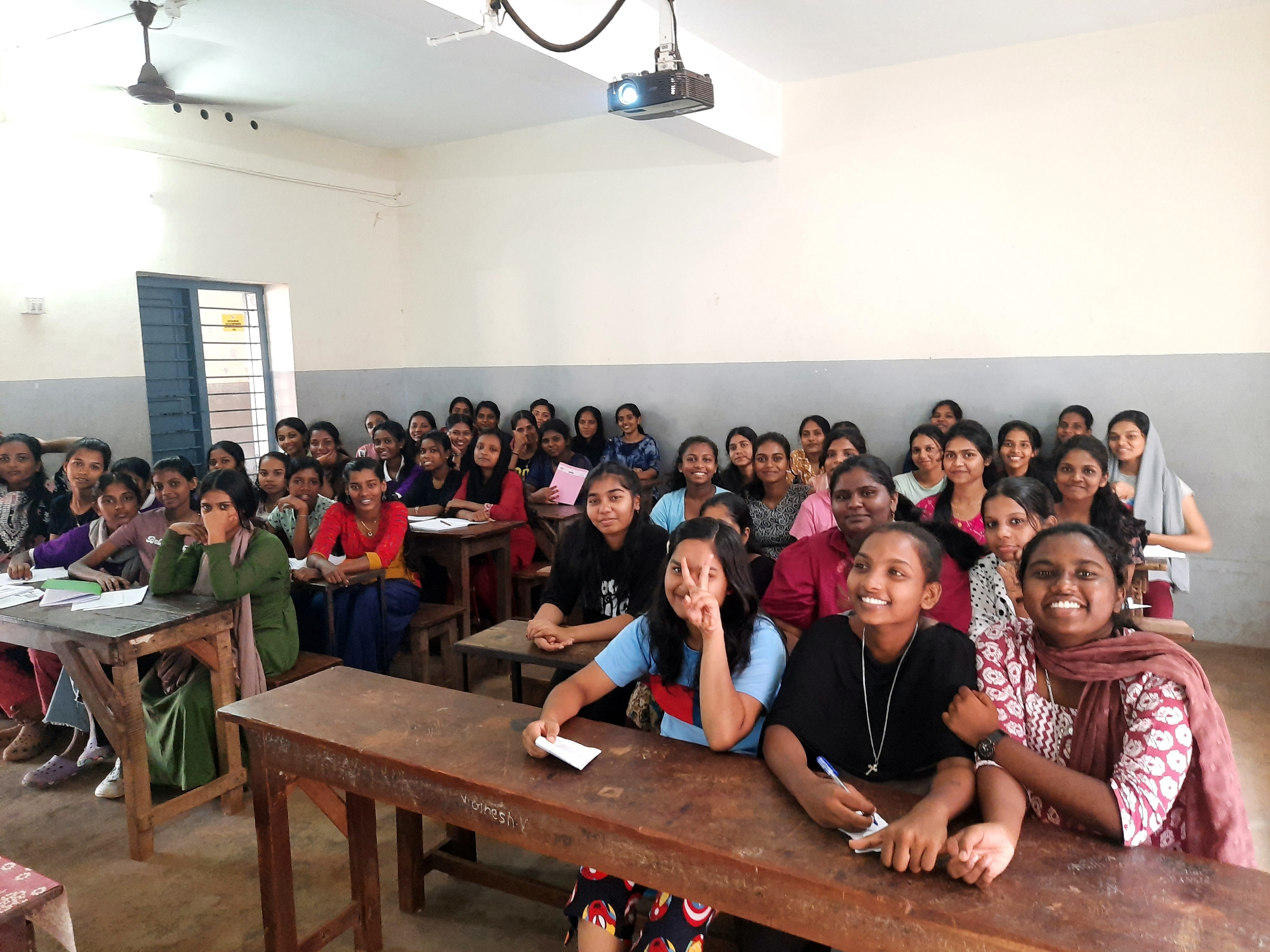
Digital literacy class in NSS camp 2024 at St Aloysious HSS Kollam

Digital literacy is necessary for the correct and effective use of various digital platforms. Literacy in social network services and Web 2.0 sites help people stay in contact with others, pass information in a timely manner, and even buy and sell goods and services. Digital literacy can also prevent people from being taken advantage of online, as photo manipulation, e-mail frauds and phishing often can fool the digitally illiterate, costing victims money and making them vulnerable to identity theft. However, those using technology and the internet to commit these manipulations and fraudulent acts possess the digital literacy abilities to fool victims by understanding the technical trends and consistencies; it becomes important to be digitally literate to always think one step ahead when utilizing the digital world.

The emergence of social media has paved the way for people to communicate and connect with one another in new and different ways. Websites like Facebook and Twitter (now X), as well as personal websites and blogs, have enabled a new type of journalism that is subjective, personal, and "represents a global conversation that is connected through its community of readers." These online communities foster group interactivity among the digitally literate. Social media also help users establish a digital identity or a "symbolic digital representation of identity attributes." Without digital literacy or the assistance of someone who is digitally literate, one cannot possess a personal digital identity (this is closely allied to, but unique from, web literacy).

Research has demonstrated that the differences in the level of digital literacy depend mainly on age and education level, while the influence of gender is decreasing. Among young people, digital literacy is high in its operational dimension. Young people rapidly move through hypertext and have a familiarity with different kinds of online resources. However, for young people, the skills to critically evaluate the content found online show a deficit. With the rise of digital connectivity amongst young people, concerns of digital safety are higher than ever. A study conducted in Poland, commissioned by the Ministry of National Knowledge, measured the digital literacy of parents in regards to digital and online safety. It concluded that parents often overestimate their level of knowledge, but clearly had an influence on their children's attitude and behavior towards the digital world. It suggests that with proper training programs, parents should have the knowledge in teaching their children about the safety precautions necessary to navigate the digital space.

=== Digital divide ===
Digital divide refers to disparities (such as those living in the developed vs the developing world) concerning access to and the use of information and communication technologies (ICT), such as computer hardware, software, and the Internet, among people. Individuals within societies that lack economic resources to build ICT infrastructure do not have adequate digital literacy, which means that their digital skills are limited. The divide can be explained by Max Weber's social stratification theory, which focuses on access to production, rather than ownership of the capital. Production means having access to ICT so that individuals can interact and produce information or create a product without which they cannot participate in learning, collaboration, and production processes. Digital literacy and digital access have become increasingly important competitive differentiators for individuals using the internet. In the article "The Great Class Wedge and the Internet's Hidden Costs", Jen Schradie discusses how social class can affect digital literacy. This creates a digital divide.

Research published in 2012 found that the digital divide, as defined by access to information technology, does not exist amongst youth in the United States. Young people report being connected to the internet at rates of 94–98%. There remains, however, a civic opportunity gap, where youth from poorer families and those attending lower socioeconomic status schools are less likely to have opportunities to apply their digital literacy. The digital divide is also defined as emphasizing the distinction between the "haves" and "have-nots", and presents all data separately for rural, urban, and central-city categories. Also, existing research on the digital divide reveals the existence of personal categorical inequalities between young and old people. An additional interpretation identified the gap between technology accessed by youth outside and inside the classroom.

=== Participation gap ===
Media theorist Henry Jenkins coined the term participation gap and distinguished the participation gap from the digital divide. According to Jenkins, in countries like the United States, where nearly everyone has access to the internet, the concept of the digital divide does not provide enough insight. As such, Jenkins uses the term participation gap to develop a more nuanced view of access to the internet. Instead of referring to the "haves" vs "have-nots" when referring to digital technologies, Jenkins proposes the participation gap refers to people who have sustained access to and competency with digital technologies due to media convergence. Jenkins states that students learn different sets of technology skills if they only have access to the internet in a library or school. In particular, Jenkins observes that students who have access to the internet at home have more opportunities to develop their skills and have fewer limitations, such as computer time limits and website filters commonly used in libraries. The participation gap is geared toward millennials. As of 2008, when this study was created, they were the oldest generation to be born in the age of technology. As of 2008, more technology has been integrated into the classroom. The issue with digital literacy is that students have access to the internet at home, which is equivalent to what they interact with in class. Some students only have access while at school and in a library. They aren't getting enough or the same quality of the digital experience. This creates the participation gap, along with an inability to understand digital literacy.

=== Digital rights ===
Digital rights are an individual's rights that allow them freedom of expression and opinion in an online setting, with roots centered on human theoretical and practical rights. It encompasses the individual's privacy rights when using the Internet, and is essentially concerned with how an individual uses different technologies and how content is distributed and mediated. Government officials and policymakers use digital rights as a springboard for enacting and developing policies and laws to obtain rights online in the same way that rights are obtained in real life. Private organizations that possess their online infrastructures also develop rights specific to their property. In today's world, most, if not all materials have shifted into an online setting and public policy has had a major influence in supporting this movement. Going beyond traditional academics, ethical rights such as copyright, citizenship and conversation can be applied to digital literacy because tools and materials nowadays can be easily copied, borrowed, stolen, and repurposed, as literacy is collaborative and interactive, especially in a networked world.

=== Digital citizenship ===
Digital citizenship refers to the "right to participate in society online". It is connected to the notion of state-based citizenship, which is determined by the country or region in which one was born, and concerns being a dutiful citizen who participates in the electoral process and online through mass media. A literate digital citizen possesses the skills to read, write and interact with online communities via screens and has an orientation towards social justice. This is best described in the article, Digital Citizenship during a Global Pandemic: Moving beyond Digital Digital Literacy, "Critical digital civic literacy, as is the case for democratic citizenship more generally, requires moving from learning about citizenship to participating and engaging in democratic communities face‐to‐face, online, and in all the spaces in between." Through the various digital skills and literacy one gains, one is able to effectively solve social problems that might arise through social platforms. Additionally, digital citizenship has three online dimensions: higher wages, democratic participation, and better communication opportunities that arise from the digital skills acquired. Digital citizenship also refers to online awareness and the ability to be safe and responsible online. This idea came from the rise of social media in the past decade, which has enhanced global connectivity and faster interaction. The idea of a good 'digital citizen' directly correlates with knowledge of, for example, how react to instances of predatory online behaviors, such as cyberbullying.

=== Digital natives and digital immigrants ===
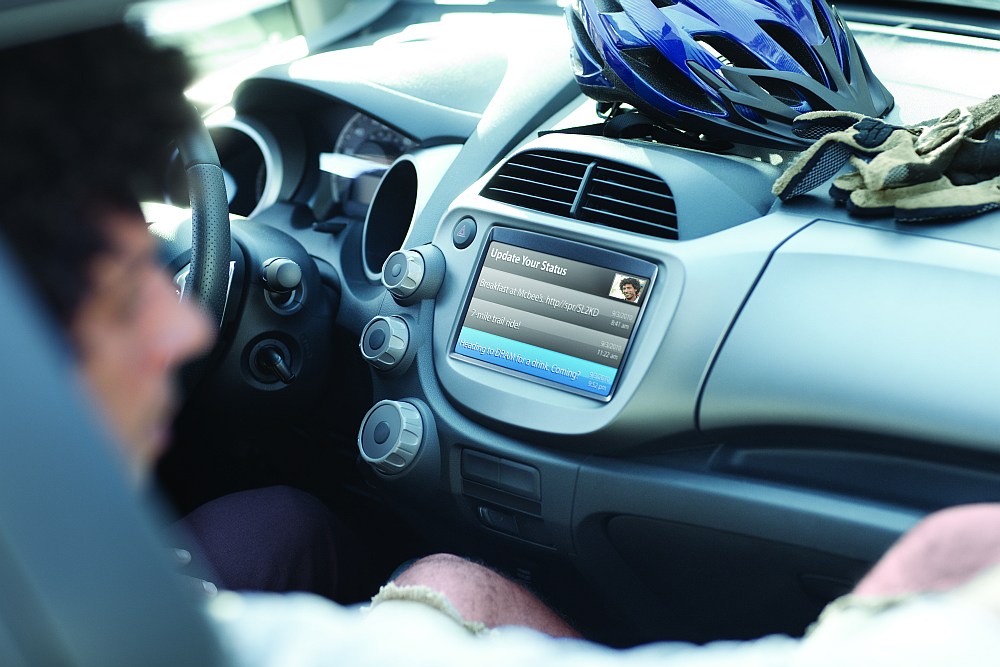
Digital natives using a smart car

Marc Prensky invented and popularized the terms digital natives and digital immigrants. A digital native is an individual born into the digital age who has used and applied digital skills from a young age, whereas 'digital immigrant' refers to an individual who adopts technology later in life. These two groups of people have had different interactions with technology since birth, a generational gap. This directly links to their individual and unique relationship with digital literacy. Digital natives brought the creation of ubiquitous information systems (UIS). These systems include mobile phones, laptop computers and personal digital assistants, as well as digital cars and buildings (smart cars and smart homes), creating a new unique technological experience.

Carr claims that digital immigrants, although they adapt to the same technology as natives, possess a sort of "accent" that prevents them from communicating the way natives do. Research shows that, due to the brain's malleable nature, technology has changed the way today's students read, perceive, and process information. Marc Prensky believes this is a problem, because today's students have a vocabulary and skill set that educators (digital immigrants at the time of his writing), may not fully understand.

Statistics and popular representations of the elderly portray them as digital immigrants. For example, in Canada in 2010, it was found that 29% of its citizens were 75 years of age and older; 60% of its citizens between the ages of 65-74 had browsed the internet in the past month. Conversely, internet activity reached almost 100% among its 15 to 24-year-old citizens.

However, the concept of a digital native has been contested. According to two studies, it was found that students over the age of 30 were more likely to possess characteristics of a digital native when compared to their younger peers. 58% of the students that participated in the study were over 30 years old. One study conducted by Margaryan, Littlejohn, and Vojt (2011), found that while college students born after 1984 frequently used the internet and other digital technology, they showed restricted use of technologies for educational and socializing purposes. In another study conducted at Hong Kong University, it was found that young students are using technology as a means of consuming entertainment and ready-made content, rather than creating content, or engaging with academic content.

== Applications ==
=== In education ===
Society is trending towards a technology-dependent world. It is now necessary to implement digital technology in education; this often includes having computers in the classroom, the use of educational software to teach curricula, and course materials that are made available to students online. Students are often taught literacy skills such as how to verify credible sources online, cite websites, and prevent plagiarism. Google and Wikipedia are frequently used by students "for everyday life research," and are just two common tools that facilitate modern education. Digital technology has impacted the way materials are taught in the classroom. Digital literacy not only helps students navigate online information but also enhances their ability to critically evaluate, synthesize, and apply digital content in academic and real-world settings. With the use of technology rising in this century, educators are altering traditional forms of teaching to include course material on concepts related to digital literacy.

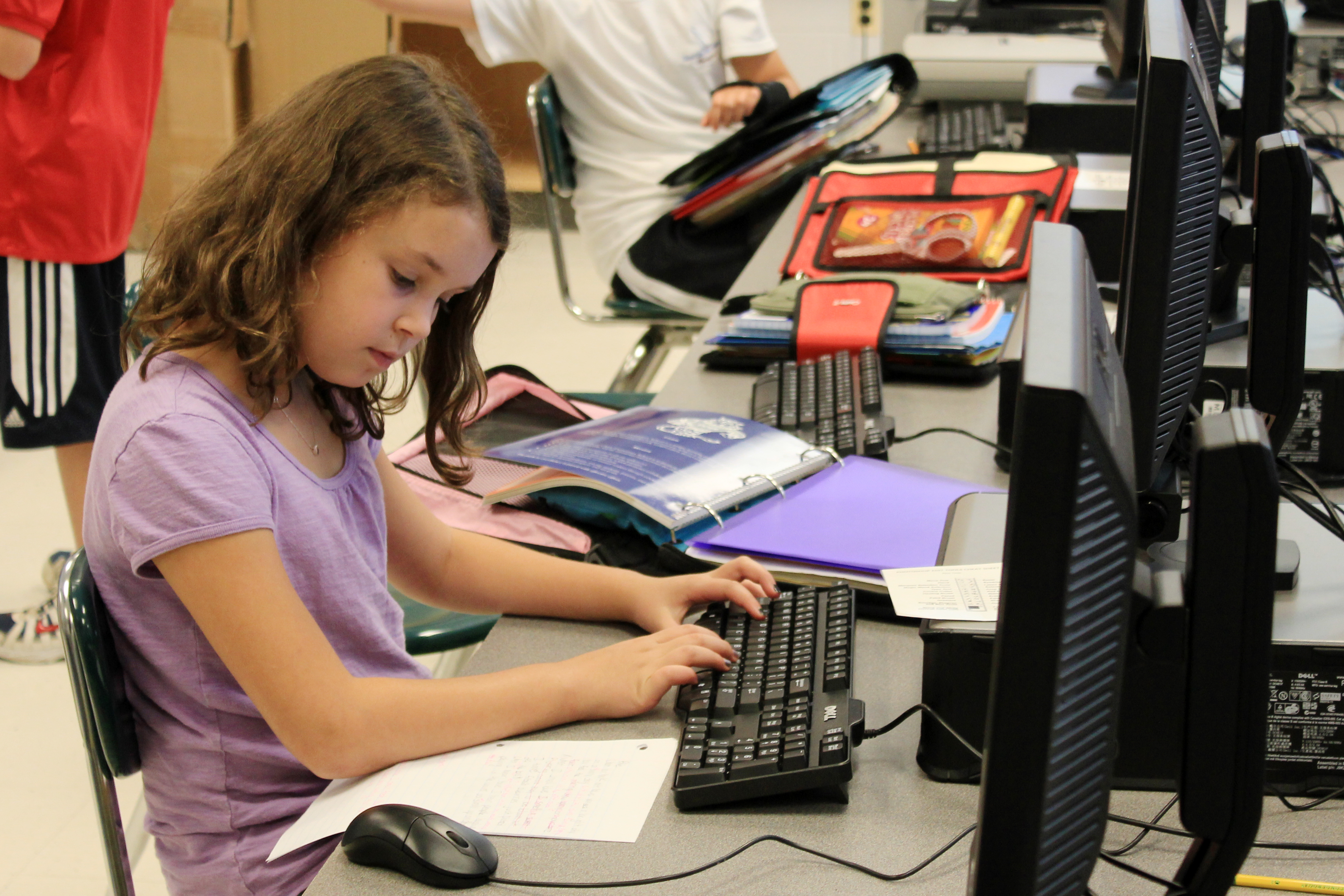
Student working on assignment using computer

Educators have also turned to social media platforms to communicate and share ideas with one another. Social media and social networks have become a crucial part of the information landscape. Social media allows educators to communicate and collaborate with one another without having to use traditional educational tools. Restrictions such as time and location can be overcome with the use of social media-based education.

New models of learning are being developed with digital literacy in mind. Several countries have developed their models to emphasize ways of finding and implementing new digital didactics, finding more opportunities and trends via surveys of educators and college instructors. Additionally, these new models of learning in the classroom have aided in promoting global connectivity, enabling students to become globally-minded citizens. According to one study by Stacy Delacruz, Virtual Field Trips, (VFT), a new form of multimedia presentation has gained popularity over the years because they offer the "opportunity for students to visit other places, talk to experts and participate in interactive learning activities without leaving the classroom". They have been used as a vessel for supporting cross-cultural collaboration amongst schools, including: "improved language skills, greater classroom engagement, deeper understandings of issues from multiple perspectives, and an increased sensitivity to multicultural differences". They also allow students to be the creators of their own digital content, a core standard from The International Society for Technology in Education (ISTE).

The COVID-19 pandemic pushed education into a more digital and online experience where teachers had to adapt to new levels of digital competency in software to continue the education system. As academic institutions discontinued in-person activity, different online meeting platforms were utilized for communication. An estimated 84% of the global student body was affected by this sudden closure due to the pandemic. Because of this, there was a clear disparity in student and school preparedness for digital education due, in large part, to a divide in digital skills and literacy that both the students and educators experienced. For example, countries like Croatia had already begun work on digitalizing its schools countrywide. In a pilot initiative, 920 instructors and over 6,000 pupils from 151 schools received computers, tablets, and presentation equipment, as well as improved connection and teacher training, so that when the pandemic struck, pilot schools were ready to begin offering online programs within two days.

The switch to online learning has brought about some concerns regarding learning effectiveness, exposure to cyber risks, and lack of socialization. These prompted the need to implement changes in how students can learn much-needed digital skills and develop digital literacy. As a response, the DQ (Digital Intelligence) Institute designed a common framework for enhancing digital literacy, digital skills, and digital readiness. Attention and focus was also brought to the development of digital literacy in higher education.

A study in Spain measured the digital knowledge of 4883 teachers of all education levels over recent school years and found that they needed further training to advance new learning models for the digital age. These programs were proposed using the joint framework. INTEF (National Institute of Educational Technologies and Teacher Training), as a reference.

In Europe, the Digital Competence of Educators (DigCompEdu), developed a framework to address and promote the development of digital literacy. It is divided into six branches: professional engagement, digital sources resources, teaching and learning, assessment, empowerment of learners, and the facilitation of learners' digital competence. The European Commission also developed the "Digital Education Action Plan", which focuses on using the COVID-19 pandemic experience to learn how technology is being used on a large scale for education and adapting the systems used for learning and training in the digital age. The framework is divided into two main strategic priorities: fostering the development of a high-performing digital education ecosystem and enhancing digital skills and competencies for digital transformation.

Nurturing these skills in education also encourages students to be more digitally literate in the future. Implementing digital literacy practices in the classroom helps to prevent barriers to entry, allowing students to gain exposure, experience, and hands-on learning regarding digital technology. Students who are able to utilize these technologies at a basic level are later able to share, receive, and create meaningful messages and ideas.

==== Digital competences ====
In 2013 the Open Universiteit Nederland released an article defining twelve digital competence areas. These areas are based on the knowledge and skills people have to acquire to be digitally literate.

- A. General knowledge and functional skills. Knowing the basics of digital devices and using them for elementary purposes.
- B. Use in everyday life. Being able to integrate digital technologies into the activities in everyday life.
- C. Specialized and advanced competence in work and creative expression. Being able to use ICT (Information and Communication Technologies) to express your creativity and improve your professional performance.
- D. Technology-mediated communication and collaboration. Being able to connect, share, communicate, and collaborate with others effectively in a digital environment.
- E. Information processing and management. Using technology to improve your ability to gather, analyze, and judge the relevance and purpose of digital information.
- F. Privacy and security. Being able to protect your privacy and take appropriate security measures.
- G. Legal and ethical aspects. Behaving appropriately in a socially responsible way in the digital environment and being aware of the legal and ethical aspects of the use of ICT.
- H. Balanced attitude towards technology. Demonstrating an informed, open-minded, and balanced attitude towards an information society and the use of digital technologies.
- I. Understanding and awareness of the role of ICT in society. Understanding the broader context of use and development of ICT.
- J. Learning about and with digital technologies. Exploring emerging technologies and integrating them.
- K. Informed decisions on appropriate digital technologies. Being aware of the most relevant or common technologies.
- L. Seamless use demonstrating self-efficacy. Confidently and creatively applying digital technologies to increase personal and professional effectiveness and efficiency.

The competencies mentioned are based on each other. Competencies A, B, and C are the basic knowledge and skills a person has to have to be a fully digitally literate person. When these three competencies are acquired, this knowledge and those skills to can be built upon to acquire the other competencies.

==== Digital writing ====
University of Southern Mississippi professor, Dr. Suzanne Mckee-Waddell conceptualized the idea of digital composition as: the ability to integrate multiple forms of communication technologies and research to create a better understanding of a topic. Digital writing is a pedagogy that is increasingly taught in universities. It is focused on the impact technology has had on various writing environments; it is not simply the process of using a computer to write. Educators in favor of digital writing argue that it is necessary because "technology fundamentally changes how writing is produced, delivered, and received." The goal of teaching digital writing is that students will increase their ability to produce a relevant, high-quality product, instead of just a standard academic paper.

One aspect of digital writing is the use of hypertext or LaTeX. As opposed to printed text, hypertext invites readers to explore information in a non-linear fashion. Hypertext consists of traditional text and hyperlinks that send readers to other texts. These links may refer to related terms or concepts (such is the case on Wikipedia), or they may enable readers to choose the order in which they read. The process of digital writing requires the composer to make unique "decisions regarding linking and omission." These decisions "give rise to questions about the author's responsibilities to the [text] and objectivity."

=== In the workforce ===
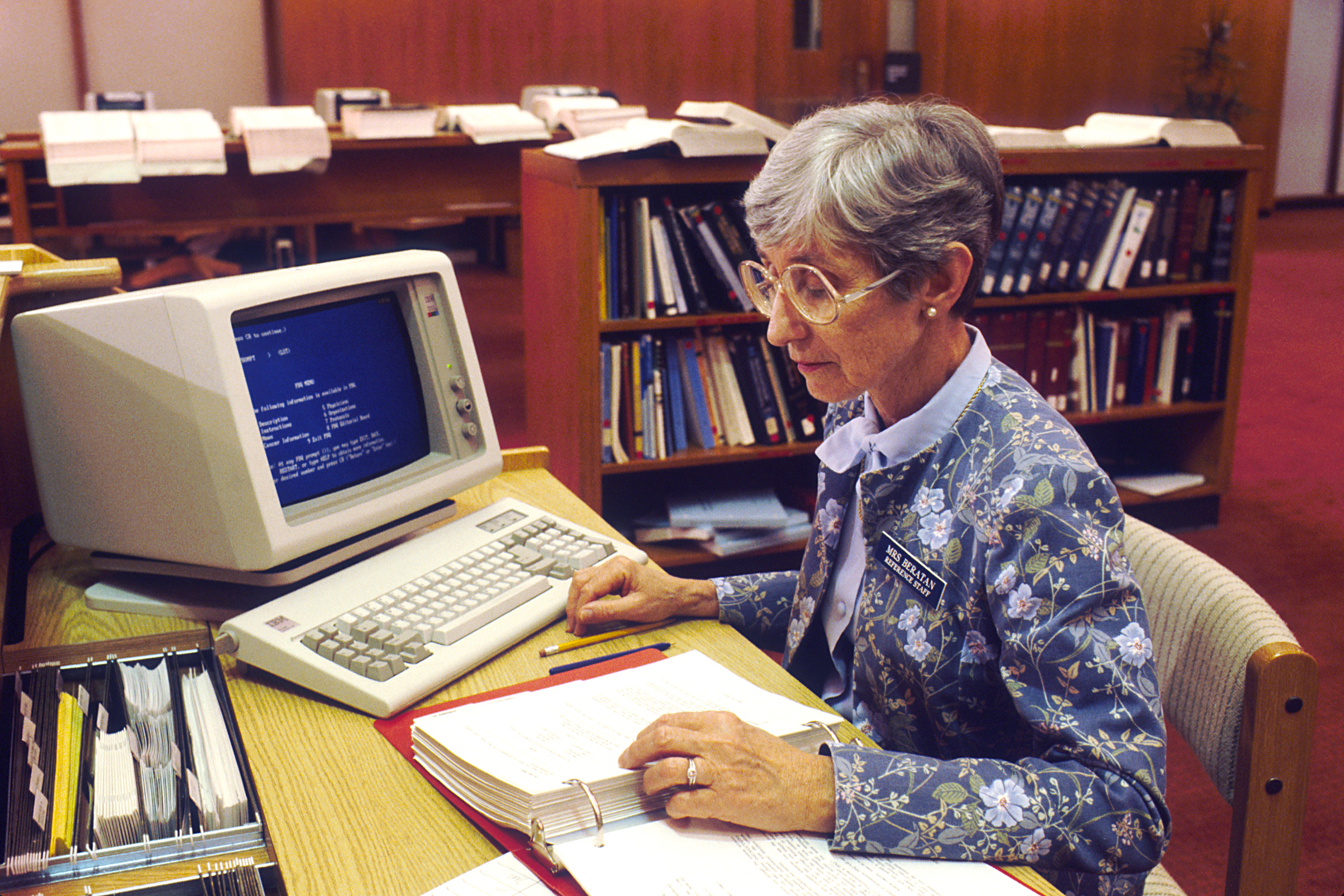
A librarian at the National Library Medicine of the United States accessing the Physician Data Query using an IBM PC (1987)

The US 2014 Workforce Innovation and Opportunity Act (WIOA) defines digital literacy skills as a workforce preparation activity. In the modern world employees are expected to be digitally literate, having full digital competence. Those who are digitally literate are more likely to be economically secure, as many jobs require a working knowledge of computers and the Internet to perform basic tasks. Additionally, digital technologies such as mobile devices, production suites, and collaboration platforms are ubiquitous in most office workplaces and are often crucial in daily tasks, since many White collar jobs today are performed primarily using digital devices and technology. Many of these jobs require proof of digital literacy to be hired or promoted. In recruitment advertisements, employers may use the names of specific software products, such as Adobe Photoshop, as shorthand for broader digital skills. Sometimes companies will administer their tests to employees, or official certification will be required. A study on the role of digital literacy in the EU labour market found that individuals were more likely to be employed the more digitally literate they were.

As technology has become cheaper and more readily available, more blue-collar jobs have required digital literacy as well. Manufacturers and retailers, for example, are expected to collect and analyze data about productivity and market trends to stay competitive. Construction workers often use computers to increase employee safety.

Digital literacy also contributes to communicative competence in the workplace, which is supported by a qualitative study conducted in 2022. Lecturers and administrators with three or more years of experience were interviewed regarding the impact of digital literacy on their work. The participants conveyed that the COVID-19 pandemic created a drastic upsurge in the use of digital technologies in the workplace. One of the significant findings is that digital literacy is especially important post-COVID-19, considering the prominent role of technology in communication. Many participants indicate that adequate communicative competence, which increasingly requires digital literacy, enhances workplace experiences and provides more opportunity for growth and promotion.

=== In entrepreneurship ===
The acquisition of digital literacy is also important when it comes to starting and growing new ventures. The emergence of the World Wide Web and other digital platforms has led to a plethora of new digital products or services that can be bought and sold. Entrepreneurs are at the forefront of this development, using digital tools or infrastructure to deliver physical products, digital artifacts, or internet-enabled service innovations. Research has shown that digital literacy for entrepreneurs consists of four levels (basic usage, application, development, and transformation) and three dimensions (cognitive, social, and technical). At the lowest level, entrepreneurs need to be able to use access devices as well as basic communication technologies to balance safety and information needs. As they move to higher levels of digital literacy, entrepreneurs will be able to master and manipulate more complex digital technologies and tools, enhancing the absorptive capacities and innovative capability of their venture. In a similar vein, if small to medium enterprises, (SMEs), possess the ability to adapt to dynamic shifts in technology, then they can take advantage of trends, marketing campaigns, and communication with consumers to generate more demand for their goods and services. Moreover, if entrepreneurs are digitally literate, then online platforms like social media can further help businesses receive feedback and generate community engagement that could potentially boost their business's performance as well as their brand image. The use of these technologies and skills assists in the creation of meaningful materials and services, which ultimately creates a more successful entrepreneurial endeavor. At the very least, the use of these technologies is important, but the true meaning of digital literacy, including navigating digital platforms, evaluating information, creating content, and engaging responsibly in online environments, allows for more business related success. A research paper published in The Journal of Asian Finance, Economics, and Business provides critical insight that suggests digital literacy has the greatest influence on the performance of SME entrepreneurs. The authors suggest their findings can help craft performance development strategies for SME entrepreneurs, arguing that their research shows the essential contribution of digital literacy in developing business and marketing networks. Additionally, the study found that digitally literate entrepreneurs can communicate and reach wider markets than non-digitally literate entrepreneurs because of the use of web-management and e-commerce platforms that were supported by data analysis and coding. That said, constraints do exist for SMEs using e-commerce, including a lack of technical understanding of information technologies, and the high cost of internet access (especially for those in rural/underdeveloped areas).

== Global impact ==
The United Nations included digital literacy in its Sustainable Development Goals for 2030, under thematic indicator 4.4.2, which encourages the development of digital literacy proficiency in teens and adults to facilitate educational and professional opportunities and growth. International initiatives like the Global Digital Literacy Council (GDLC) and the Coalition for Digital Intelligence (CDI) have also highlighted the need for digital literacy, and strategies to address this on a global scale. The CDI, under the umbrella of the DQ Institute, created the Common Framework for Digital Literacy, Skills, and Readiness in 2019, that conceptualizes eight areas of digital life; identity, use, safety, security, emotional intelligence, communication, literacy, and rights; three levels of maturity: citizenship, creativity, and competitiveness; and three components of competency: knowledge, attitudes and values, and skills. The UNESCO Institute for Statistics (UIS) also works to create, gather, map, and assess common frameworks on digital literacy across multiple member-states around the world.

In an attempt to narrow the Digital Divide, on September 26, 2018, the United States Senate Foreign Relations Committee passed legislation to help provide access to the internet in developing countries via the H.R.600 Digital Global Access Policy Act. The legislation itself was based on Senator Ed Markey's Digital Age Act, which was first introduced to the senate in 2016. In addition, Senator Markey provided a statement after the act was passed through the Senate: "American ingenuity created the internet and American leadership should help bring its power to the developing world," said Senator Markey. "Bridging the global digital divide can help promote prosperity, strengthen democracy, expand educational opportunity and lift some of the world's poorest and most vulnerable out of poverty. The Digital GAP Act is a passport to the 21st-century digital economy, linking the people of the developing world to the most successful communications and commerce tool in history. I look forward to working with my colleagues to get this legislation signed into law and to harness the power of the internet to help the developing world."

The Philippines' Education Secretary Jesli Lapus has emphasized the importance of digital literacy in Filipino education. He claims a resistance to change is the main obstacle to improving the nation's education in the globalized world. In 2008, Lapus was inducted into Certiport's "Champions of Digital Literacy" Hall of Fame for his work emphasizing digital literacy.

A 2011 study by the Southern African Linguistics & Applied Language Studies program did an observation of some South African university students regarding digital literacy. While their courses did require some sort of digital literacy, very few students actually had access to a computer. Many had to pay others to type any work, as their digital literacy was almost nonexistent. Findings show that class, ignorance, and inexperience still affect access to learning that South African university students may need.

== See also ==
- Computer literacy
- Content moderation
- Cyber self-defense
- Data literacy
- Digital citizen
- Digital equity
- Digital intelligence
- Digital rhetoric
- Digital rights
- Fact-checking
- Media literacy
- Web literacy
- Digital divide
- 21st century skills

== Bibliography ==
- Vuorikari, R., Punie, Y., Gomez, S. C., & Van Den Brande, G. (2016). DigComp 2.0: The Digital Competence Framework for Citizens. Update Phase 1: The Conceptual Reference Model (No. JRC101254). Institute for Prospective Technological Studies, Joint Research Centre. https://ec.europa.eu/jrc/en/digcomp and https://ec.europa.eu/jrc/en/publication/eur-scientific-and-technical-research-reports/digcomp-20-digital-competence-framework-citizens-update-phase-1-conceptual-reference-model
- Janssen, José; Stoyanov, Slavi; Ferrari, Anusca; Punie, Yves; Pannekeet, Kees; Sloep, Peter (October 2013). "Experts' views on digital competence: Commonalities and differences". Computers & Education. 68: 473–481. doi:10.1016/j.compedu.2013.06.008. hdl:1820/4986.
- Ng, D. T. K., Leung, J. K. L., Chu, S. K. W., & Qiao, M. (2021). "Conceptualizing AI Literacy: An Exploratory Review" (Vol. 2, Article 100041). Computers and Education: Artificial Intelligence. https://doi.org/10.1016/j.caeai.2021.100041
- Reedy, K., Parker, J., & EBSCO Publishing. (2019). Digital literacy unpacked (K. Reedy & J. Parker, Eds.). Facet Publishing. http://ezproxy.uky.edu/login?url=http://search.ebscohost.com/login.aspx?direct=true&scope=site&db=nlebk&db=nlabk&AN=1817104
- Saeed, H. K., Razak, N. A., & Aladdin, A. (2022). Digital Literacy and Communicative Competence among Academic Leaders: Post-COVID-19 Study. GEMA Online Journal of Language Studies, 22(4), 232–245. https://doi.org/10.17576/gema-2022-2204-13
- Nichols, T. P., & Stornaiuolo, A. (2019). Assembling "Digital Literacies": Contingent Pasts, Possible Futures. Media & Communication, 7(2), 14–24. https://doi.org/10.17645/mac.v7i2.1946
- Cartelli, A., & IGI Global. (2012). Current trends and future practices for digital literacy and competence. IGI Global 701 E. Chocolate Avenue, Hershey, Pennsylvania, 17033, USA. https://doi.org/10.4018/978-1-4666-0903-7
