= Richard W. Strong =

American education expert

Richard Strong
- Born: February 26, 1946- New York City, New York
- Died: January 27, 2008; New York City, New York
- Occupations: Author, Consultant
- Writing career
- Subject: Education reform

Richard W. Strong (February 26, 1946 – January 27, 2008) was an American education expert, former teacher and author. He co-founded the Institute for Community and Difference. Strong consulted the Association for Supervision and Curriculum Development and dozens of school district across the United States, as well as teacher and professional organizations and state education agencies. A recognized leader in the movement for authentic assessment, Strong was a former district-level coordinator for gifted and talented education and a prolific writer on many topics in education.

Strong was awarded the "New York State Educator of the Year" award in 2007 by the New York Association for Supervision and Curriculum Development.

== Bibliography ==
=== Books ===
- (2007) Strategic Teacher: Selecting the Right Research-Based Strategy for Every Lesson with Harvey F. Silver and Matthew J. Perini.
- (2007) Reading for Academic Success, Grades 2-6: Differentiated Strategies for Struggling, Average, and Advanced Readers with Harvey F. Silver and Matthew J. Perini.
- (2003) Styles and Strategies for Teaching Middle School Mathematics with Dr. Ed Thomas and Harvey F. Silver.
- (2002) Reading for Academic Success: Powerful Strategies for Struggling, Average, and Advanced Readers, Grades 7-12 with Harvey F. Silver, Matthew J. Perini and Gregory M. Tuculescu.
- (2001) Teaching What Matters Most: Standards and Strategies for Raising Student Achievement with Harvey F. Silver and Matthew J. Perini.
- (2000) So Each May Learn: Integrating Learning Styles and Multiple Intelligences with Harvey F. Silver and Matthew J. Perini.
- (2000) Reading for Meaning: Research-Based Strategies for Teachers (The Teaching & Learning Strategies Library) with Harvey F. Silver and Matthew Perini.
- (1996) Teaching Styles and Strategies Interventions to Enrich Instructional Decision-Making with J. Robert Hanson, Patricia B. Schwartz and Harvey F. Silver.
- (1996) Teaching Styles and Strategies with Harvey F. Silver, Robert J. Hanson, et al.
