= National Digital Inclusion Alliance =

- Founded: May 2015
- Founder: Angela Siefer
- Type: Non-profit Organization
- Purpose: A Unified Voice for Digital Inclusion Policies and Programs
- Members: 604 affiliated organizations
- Website: www.digitalinclusion.org

National Digital Inclusion Alliance (NDIA) is a US nonprofit organization that brings together over 600 non-profit organizations, policy-makers, and academics to advocate for national access to broadband and to put an end to the multiple digital divides. NDIA has provided community-vetted definitions of digital equity and digital inclusion, puts on an annual conference called Net Inclusion, and sponsors an annual Digital Inclusion Week.

NDIA argues that the US government needs "an organized federal strategy" to get broadband to rural and other underserved areas and have worked to support the expansion of the Federal Communications Commission's Lifeline program to expand to include broadband subsidies.

NDIA was founded in May 2015 under the auspices of the PAST Foundation in order to be "a unified voice for local technology training, home broadband access, and public broadband access programs." NDIA is a membership-based organization, and is an independent 501(c)(3) as of 2021. As of October 2021, NDIA had 604 affiliated organizations.

== Impact ==
NDIA uses data from the American Community Survey to highlight how many households in the U.S. lack "fixed broadband internet subscriptions" to create a list of America's worst connected cities.

Using FCC broadband availability data, NDIA did a six-month mapping analysis of Cleveland neighborhoods showing the distribution of its highest and lowest internet speeds. Using this data, they accused AT&T of "digital redlining" via a formal complaint with the FCC claiming AT&T did not make upgrades in low-income neighborhoods while deploying fiber in wealthier neighborhoods. Former FCC Chairman Ajit Pai used this report to encourage the creation of "Gigabit Opportunity Zones" in low-income areas in the U.S.

== Publications ==
- Worst Connected Cities: 2016, 2015 2014
- Limiting Broadband Investment to "Rural Only” Discriminates Against Black Americans and other Communities of Color
- The Digital Inclusion Startup Manual
- The Digital Inclusion Coalition Guidebook
- AT&Ts Digital Redlining
