= Al Gore =

Vice President of the United States from 1993 to 2001

- Official portrait, 1994

45th Vice President of the United States
- In office January 20, 1993 – January 20, 2001
- President: Bill Clinton
- Preceded by: Dan Quayle
- Succeeded by: Dick Cheney

United States Senator from Tennessee
- In office January 3, 1985 – January 2, 1993
- Preceded by: Howard Baker
- Succeeded by: Harlan Mathews

Member of the U.S. House of Representatives from Tennessee
- In office January 3, 1977 – January 3, 1985
- Preceded by: Joe L. Evins
- Succeeded by: Bart Gordon
- Constituency: 4th district (1977–1983); 6th district (1983–1985)

Personal details
- Born: Albert Arnold Gore Jr. March 31, 1948 (age 78) Washington, D.C., U.S.
- Party: Democratic
- Spouse: Tipper Aitcheson (m. 1970; sep. 2010)
- Children: 4, including Karenna and Kristin
- Parents: Albert Gore Sr.; Pauline LaFon
- Education: Harvard University (BA); Vanderbilt University (attended)
- Civilian awards: See full list
- Website: Official website

Military service
- Branch/service: United States Army
- Years of service: 1969–1971
- Rank: Specialist 4
- Unit: 20th Engineer Brigade
- Battles/wars: Vietnam War
- Military awards: National Defense Service Medal; Vietnam Service Medal; Republic of Vietnam Campaign Medal
- Al Gore's voice Gore on submitting the 1999 budget Recorded February 2, 1998

Albert Arnold Gore Jr. (born March 31, 1948) is an American former politician, businessman, and environmentalist who served as the 45th vice president of the United States from 1993 to 2001 under President Bill Clinton. A member of the Democratic Party, he previously represented Tennessee in both houses of the U.S. Congress, first as a member of the U.S. House of Representatives from 1977 to 1985, and then as a U.S. senator from 1985 to 1993. Gore was the Democratic nominee in the 2000 presidential election, winning the popular vote but losing the electoral college to Republican nominee George W. Bush.

The son of politician Albert Gore Sr., Gore was raised in Tennessee and Washington, D.C., where he was born. After graduating from Harvard University and serving in the U.S. Army, he quit law school to run as a representative for Tennessee's 4th congressional district in 1976. Gore was re-elected three times before running for U.S. Senate in 1984, winning re-election in 1990. He was considered a moderate and an "Atari Democrat". Gore served as vice president during the Clinton administration from 1993 to 2001, defeating then-incumbents George H. W. Bush and Dan Quayle in 1992, and Bob Dole and Jack Kemp in 1996, and was the first Democrat to serve two full terms as vice president since John Nance Garner. As of 2025, Gore's 1990 re-election remains the last time Democrats won a Senate election in Tennessee.

Gore was the Democratic presidential nominee in the 2000 election, in which he lost the U.S. Electoral College vote by five electoral votes to Republican nominee George W. Bush while winning the popular vote by 543,895 votes. (Note: Presidential elections in the U.S. are decided via the electoral college. By losing the electoral college, Gore lost the election to Bush.) The election concluded after the U.S. Supreme Court ruled 5–4 in Bush v. Gore against a previous ruling by the Supreme Court of Florida on a re-count. He is one of five presidential candidates in American history to lose a presidential election despite winning the popular vote.

After his vice presidency ended in 2001, Gore remained prominent as an author and environmental activist, and his work in climate change activism earned him (jointly with the IPCC) the Nobel Peace Prize in 2007. Gore is the founder and chair of The Climate Reality Project, the co-founder and chair of Generation Investment Management, the since-defunct Current TV network, a former member of the Board of Directors of Apple Inc. and a senior adviser to Google. Gore is also a partner in the venture capital firm Kleiner Perkins, heading its climate change solutions group. He has served as a visiting professor at Middle Tennessee State University, Columbia University Graduate School of Journalism, Fisk University, and the University of California, Los Angeles. He served on the Board of Directors of World Resources Institute.

Gore has received a number of awards that include the Nobel Peace Prize (joint award with the Intergovernmental Panel on Climate Change, 2007), a Primetime Emmy Award for Current TV (2007), and a Webby Award (2005). Gore was also the subject of the Academy Award winning (2007) documentary An Inconvenient Truth in 2006, as well as its 2017 sequel An Inconvenient Sequel: Truth to Power. In 2007, he was named a runner-up for Time's 2007 Person of the Year. In 2008, Gore won the Dan David Prize for Social Responsibility, and in 2024 was awarded the Presidential Medal of Freedom by President Joe Biden.

== Early life and education ==
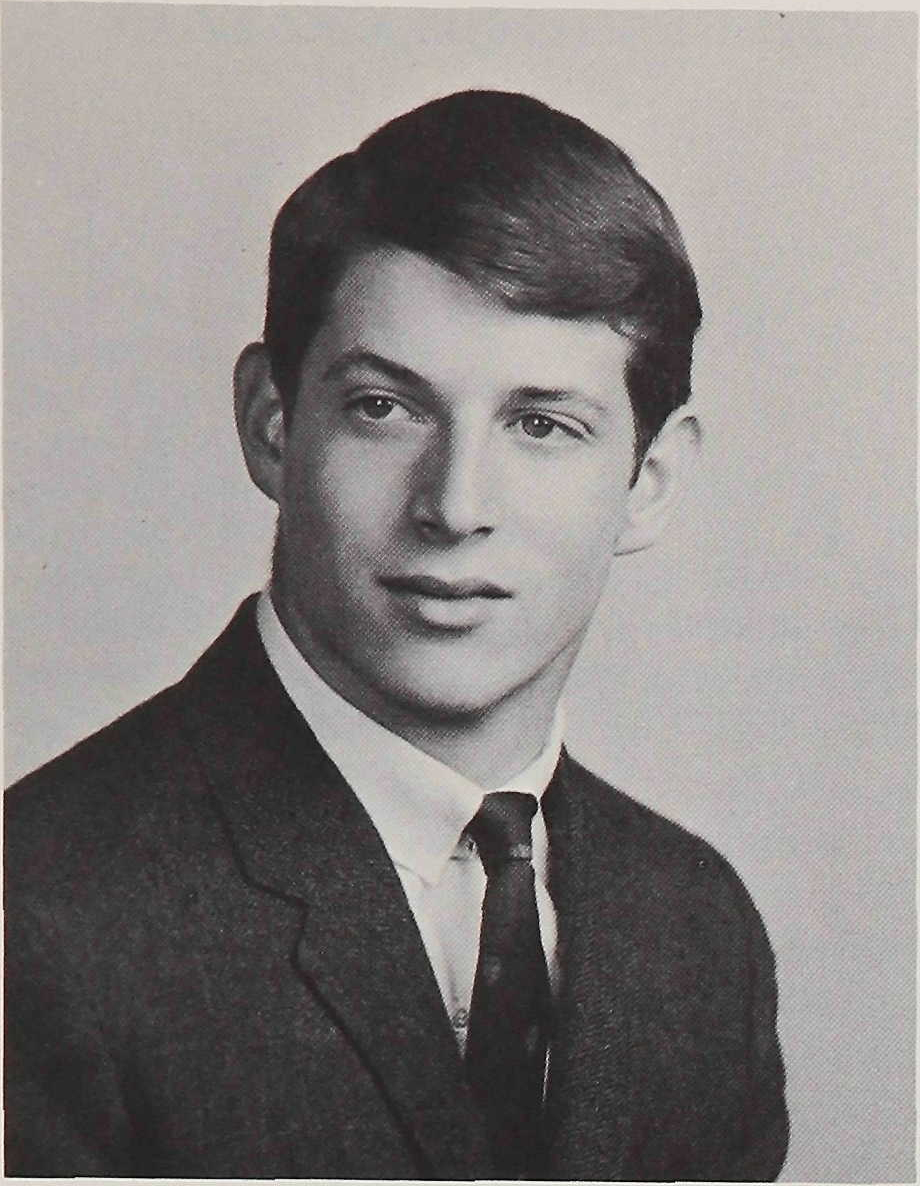
Gore in St. Albans School's 1965 yearbook

Albert Arnold Gore Jr. was born on March 31, 1948, in Washington, D.C., as the second of two children born to Albert Gore Sr., a U.S. Representative who later served for 18 years as a U.S. Senator from Tennessee, and Pauline LaFon Gore, one of the first women to graduate from the Vanderbilt University Law School. Gore is a descendant of Scots Irish immigrants who first settled in Virginia during the mid-17th-century and moved to Tennessee after the Revolutionary War. His older sister Nancy LaFon Gore died of lung cancer in 1984.

During the school year he lived with his family in The Fairfax Hotel in the Embassy Row section in Washington D.C. During the summer months, he worked on the family farm in Carthage, Tennessee, where the Gores grew tobacco and hay and raised cattle.

Gore attended St. Albans School, an independent college preparatory day and boarding school for boys in Washington, D.C., from 1956 to 1965, a prestigious feeder school for the Ivy League. He was the captain of the football team, threw discus for the track and field team and participated in basketball, art, and government. He graduated 25th in a class of 51, applied to one college, Harvard University, and was accepted.

=== Harvard ===
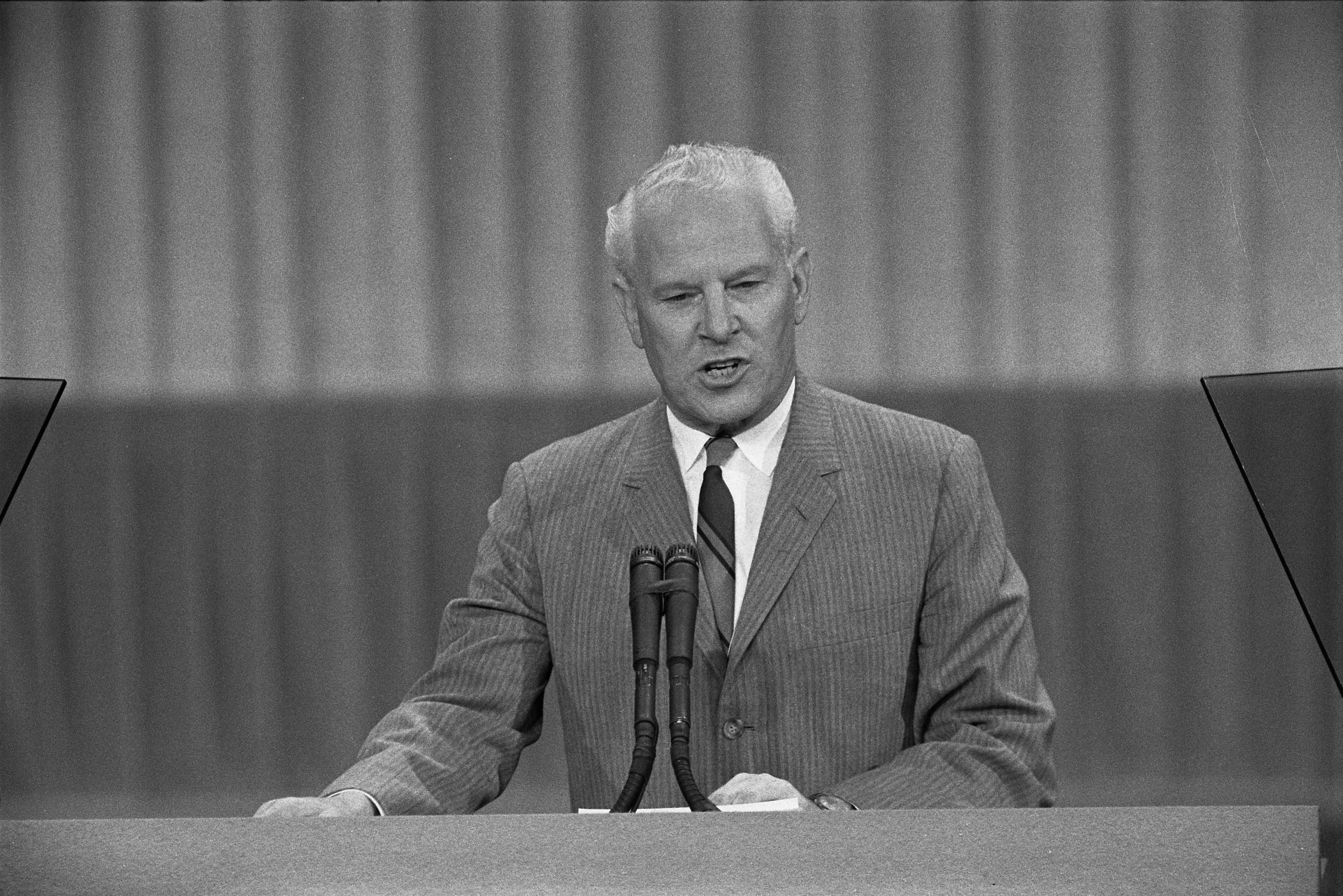
Albert Gore Sr. delivering a speech to the 1968 Democratic National Convention which the younger Gore helped him write

Gore enrolled in Harvard College in 1965; he initially planned to major in English and write novels but later decided to major in government. On his second day on campus, he began campaigning for the freshman student government council and was elected its president. He was roommates with future actor Tommy Lee Jones in Dunster House.

Gore was an avid reader who fell in love with scientific and mathematical theories, but he did not do well in science classes and avoided taking math. During his first two years, his grades placed him in the lower one-fifth of his class. During his second year, he reportedly spent much of his time watching television, shooting pool and occasionally smoking marijuana. In his junior and senior years, he became more involved with his studies, earning As and Bs. In his senior year, he took a class with oceanographer and global warming theorist Roger Revelle, who sparked Gore's interest in global warming and other environmental issues. Gore earned an A on his thesis, "The Impact of Television on the Conduct of the Presidency, 1947–1969", and graduated with an A.B. cum laude in June 1969.

Gore was in college during the era of anti-Vietnam War protests. He was opposed to the war but disagreed with the tactics of the student protest movement, and believed it to be juvenile and misguided to use a private university as a venue to vent anger at the war. He and his friends did not participate in Harvard demonstrations. John Tyson, a former roommate, recalled, "We distrusted these movements a lot ... We were a pretty traditional bunch of guys, positive for civil rights and women's rights but formal, transformed by the social revolution to some extent but not buying into something we considered detrimental to our country."

Gore and his sister, Nancy, accompanied their parents to the 1968 Democratic National Convention in Chicago. With his father being a senator, his family had tickets to sit inside of the convention hall at the International Amphitheatre. He helped write an anti-war address that his father delivered to the convention. While at the convention, Gore witnessed some of the protests in the streets, but remained with his parents inside of their hotel room when violence erupted at the protests.

== Military service and early career (1969–1976) ==
=== Military service ===
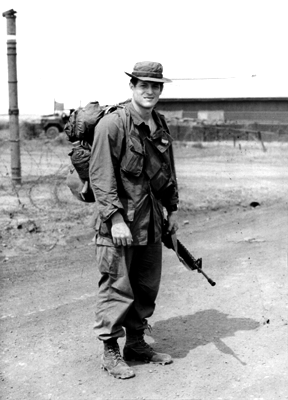
Gore with the 20th Engineer Brigade in Biên Hòa as a journalist with the paper The Castle Courier

When Gore graduated in 1969, he immediately became eligible for the military draft. His father, a vocal anti-Vietnam War critic, was facing re-election in 1970. Gore eventually decided that enlisting in the Army would be the best course between serving his country, his personal values and interests. Although nearly all of his Harvard classmates avoided the draft and service in Vietnam, Gore believed if he found a way around military service, he would be handing an issue to his father's Republican opponent. According to Gore's Senate biography, "He appeared in uniform in his father's campaign commercials, one of which ended with his father advising: 'Son, always love your country'." Despite this, Gore Sr. lost the election to an opponent who vastly out-fundraised him. This opponent was later found by the Watergate commission to have accepted illegal money from Nixon's operatives.

Gore has said that his other reason for enlisting was that he did not want someone with fewer options than he to go in his place. Actor Tommy Lee Jones, a former college housemate, recalled Gore saying that "if he found a fancy way of not going, someone else would have to go in his place". His Harvard advisor, Richard Neustadt, also stated that Gore decided, "that he would have to go as an enlisted man because, he said, 'In Tennessee, that's what most people have to do.'" In addition, Michael Roche, Gore's editor for The Castle Courier, stated that "anybody who knew Al Gore in Vietnam knows he could have sat on his butt and he didn't."

After enlisting in August 1969, Gore returned to the anti war Harvard campus in his military uniform to say goodbye to his adviser and was "jeered" at by students. He later said he was astonished by the "emotional field of negativity and disapproval and piercing glances that ... certainly felt like real hatred". Gore had basic training at Fort Dix from August to October, and then was assigned to be a journalist at Fort Rucker, Alabama. In April 1970, he was named Rucker's "Soldier of the Month".

His orders to be sent to Vietnam were "held up" for some time and the Gore family suspected that this was due to a fear by the Nixon administration that if something happened to him, his father would gain sympathy votes. He was finally shipped to Vietnam on January 2, 1971, after his father had lost his seat in the Senate during the 1970 Senate election, becoming one "of only about a dozen of the 1,115 Harvard graduates in the [all-male] Class of '69 who went to Vietnam". Gore was stationed with the 20th Engineer Brigade in Biên Hòa and was a journalist with The Castle Courier. He received an honorable discharge from the Army in May 1971. Of his time in the Army, Gore later stated, "I didn't do the most, or run the gravest danger. But I was proud to wear my country's uniform." He also later stated that his experience in Vietnam

didn't change my conclusions about the war being a terrible mistake, but it struck me that opponents to the war, including myself, really did not take into account the fact that there were an awful lot of South Vietnamese who desperately wanted to hang on to what they called freedom. Coming face to face with those sentiments expressed by people who did the laundry and ran the restaurants and worked in the fields was something I was naively unprepared for.

=== Vanderbilt and journalism ===
Gore was "dispirited" after his return from Vietnam. The Nashville Scene later noted that "his father's defeat made service in a conflict he deeply opposed even more abhorrent to Gore. His experiences in the war zone don't seem to have been deeply traumatic in themselves; although the engineers were sometimes fired upon, Gore has said he didn't see full-scale combat. Still, he felt that his participation in the war was wrong." Although his parents wanted him to go to law school, Gore first attended Vanderbilt University Divinity School (1971–1972) on a Rockefeller Foundation scholarship for people planning secular careers. He later said he went there in order to explore "spiritual issues", and that "he had hoped to make sense of the social injustices that seemed to challenge his religious beliefs".

In 1971, Gore began to work the night shift for The Tennessean as an investigative reporter. His investigations of corruption among members of Nashville's Metro Council resulted in the arrest and prosecution of two councilmen for separate offenses. In 1974, he took a leave of absence from The Tennessean to attend Vanderbilt University Law School. His decision to become an attorney was a partial result of his time as a journalist, as he realized that, while he could expose corruption, he could not change it. Gore did not complete law school, deciding abruptly in 1976 to run for a seat in the U.S. House of Representatives when he found out that his father's former seat in the House was about to be vacated.

== Congressional career (1977–1993) ==
Gore began serving in the U.S. Congress at the age of 28 and stayed there for the next 16 years, serving in both the House (1977–1985) and the Senate (1985–1993). Gore spent many weekends in Tennessee, working with his constituents.

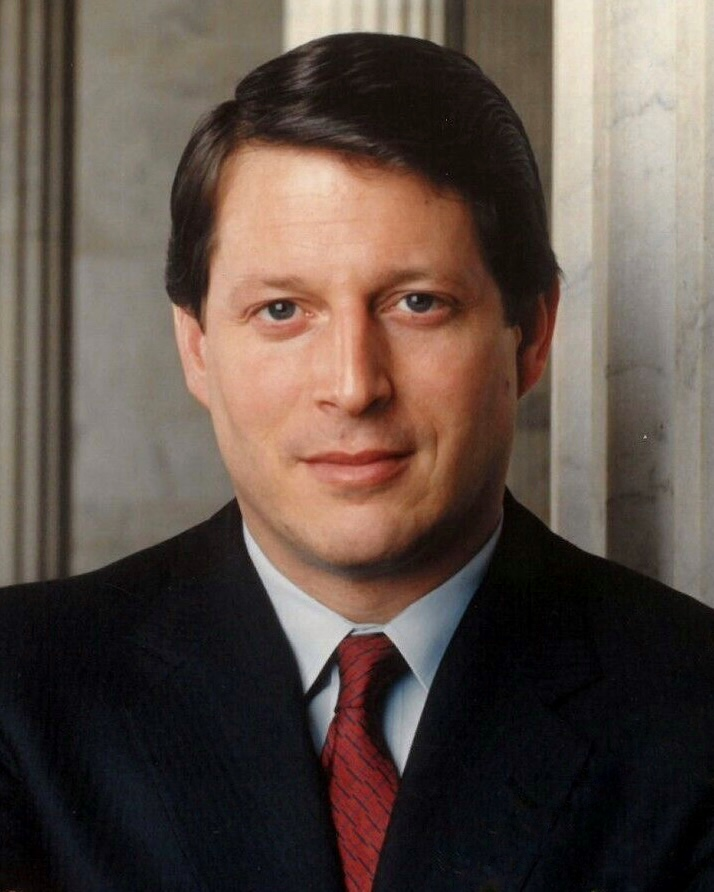
Gore's portrait as Senator

=== House and Senate ===
At the end of February 1976, U.S. Representative Joe L. Evins unexpectedly announced his retirement from Congress, making Tennessee's 4th congressional district seat, to which he had succeeded Albert Gore Sr. in 1953, open. Within hours after The Tennessean publisher John Seigenthaler Sr. called him to tell him the announcement was forthcoming, Gore decided to quit law school and run for the House of Representatives:

Gore's abrupt decision to run for the open seat surprised even himself; he later said that "I didn't realize myself I had been pulled back so much to it." The news came as a "bombshell" to his wife. Tipper Gore held a job in The Tennessean's photo lab and was working on a master's degree in psychology, but she joined in her husband's campaign (with assurance that she could get her job at The Tennessean back if he lost). By contrast, Gore asked his father to stay out of his campaign: "I must become my own man," he explained. "I must not be your candidate."

Gore won the 1976 Democratic primary for the district with "32 percent of the vote, three percentage points more than his nearest rival", and was opposed by only an independent candidate in the election, recording 94 percent of the overall vote. He went on to win the next three elections, in 1978, 1980 and 1982, where "he was unopposed twice and won 79 percent of the vote the other time". In 1984, Gore successfully ran for a seat in the U.S. Senate, which had been vacated by Republican Senate Majority Leader Howard Baker. He was "unopposed in the Democratic Senatorial primary and won the general election going away", despite the fact that Republican President Ronald Reagan swept Tennessee in his reelection campaign the same year. Gore defeated Republican senatorial nominee Victor Ashe, subsequently the mayor of Knoxville, and the Republican-turned-Independent, Ed McAteer, founder of the Christian right Religious Roundtable organization that had worked to elect Reagan as president in 1980.

During his time in Congress, Gore was considered a moderate, once referring to himself as a "raging moderate", opposing federal funding of abortion, voting in favor of a bill which supported a moment of silence in schools, and voting against a ban on interstate sales of guns. In 1981, Gore was quoted as saying with regard to homosexuality, "I think it is wrong", and "I don't pretend to understand it, but it is not just another normal optional life style." In his 1984 Senate race, Gore said when discussing homosexuality, "I do not believe it is simply an acceptable alternative that society should affirm." He also said that he would not take campaign funds from gay rights groups. Although he maintained a position against homosexuality and gay marriage in the 1980s, Gore said in 2008 that he thinks "gay men and women ought to have the same rights as heterosexual men and women...to join together in marriage." His position as a moderate (and on policies related to that label) shifted later in life after he became Vice President and ran for president in 2000.

During his tenure in the House, Gore voted in favor of the bill establishing Martin Luther King Jr. Day as a federal holiday. While Gore initially did not vote on the Civil Rights Restoration Act of 1987 in January 1988, he voted to override President Reagan's veto the following March. Gore voted against the nomination of William Rehnquist as Chief Justice of the United States, as well as the nominations of Robert Bork and Clarence Thomas to the U.S. Supreme Court.

During his time in the House, Gore sat on the Energy and Commerce and the Science and Technology committees, chairing the Science Committee's Subcommittee on Oversight and Investigations for four years. He also sat on the House Intelligence Committee and, in 1982, introduced the Gore Plan for arms control, to "reduce chances of a nuclear first strike by cutting multiple warheads and deploying single-warhead mobile launchers". While in the Senate, he sat on the Homeland Security and Governmental Affairs, the Rules and Administration, and the Armed Services Committees. In 1991, Gore was one of ten Democrats who supported the Gulf War.

Gore was considered one of the Atari Democrats, given this name due to their "passion for technological issues, from biomedical research and genetic engineering to the environmental impact of the "greenhouse effect". On March 19, 1979, he had become the first member of Congress to appear on C-SPAN. During this time, Gore co-chaired the Congressional Clearinghouse on the Future with Newt Gingrich. In addition, he has been described as having been a "genuine nerd, with a geek reputation running back to his days as a futurist Atari Democrat in the House. Before computers were comprehensible, let alone sexy, the poker-faced Gore struggled to explain artificial intelligence and fiber-optic networks to sleepy colleagues." Internet pioneers Vint Cerf and Bob Kahn noted that,

as far back as the 1970s, Congressman Gore promoted the idea of high-speed telecommunications as an engine for both economic growth and the improvement of our educational system. He was the first elected official to grasp the potential of computer communications to have a broader impact than just improving the conduct of science and scholarship ... the Internet, as we know it today, was not deployed until 1983. When the Internet was still in the early stages of its deployment, Congressman Gore provided intellectual leadership by helping create the vision of the potential benefits of high-speed computing and communication.

Gore introduced the Supercomputer Network Study Act of 1986. He also sponsored hearings on how advanced technologies might be put to use in areas like coordinating the response of government agencies to natural disasters and other crises. As a Senator, Gore began to craft the High Performance Computing Act of 1991 (commonly referred to as "The Gore Bill") after hearing the 1988 report Toward a National Research Network submitted to Congress by a group chaired by UCLA professor of computer science, Leonard Kleinrock, one of the central creators of the ARPANET (the ARPANET, first deployed by Kleinrock and others in 1969, is the predecessor of the Internet). The bill was passed on December 9, 1991, and led to the National Information Infrastructure (NII) which Gore referred to as the "information superhighway". After joining the House of Representatives, Gore held the "first congressional hearings on the climate change, and co-sponsor[ed] hearings on toxic waste and global warming". He continued to speak on the topic throughout the 1980s. In 1990, Senator Gore presided over a three-day conference with legislators from over 42 countries which sought to create a Global Marshall Plan, "under which industrial nations would help less developed countries grow economically while still protecting the environment".

=== Son's 1989 accident and first book ===
On April 3, 1989, Al, Tipper and their six-year-old son Albert were leaving a baseball game. Albert ran across the street to see his friend and was hit by a car. He was thrown 30 feet (9 m) and then traveled along the pavement for another 20 feet (6 m). Gore later recalled: "I ran to his side and held him and called his name, but he was motionless, limp and still, without breath or pulse.... His eyes were open with the nothingness stare of death, and we prayed, the two of us, there in the gutter, with only my voice." Albert was tended to by two nurses who happened to be present during the accident. The Gores spent the next month in the hospital with Albert. Gore also commented: "Our lives were consumed with the struggle to restore his body and spirit." This event was "a trauma so shattering that [Gore] views it as a moment of personal rebirth", a "key moment in his life" which "changed everything".

In August 1991, Gore announced that his son's accident was a factor in his decision not to run for president in 1992. Gore stated: "I would like to be President.... But I am also a father, and I feel deeply about my responsibility to my children.... I didn't feel right about tearing myself away from my family to the extent that is necessary in a Presidential campaign." During this time, Gore wrote Earth in the Balance, a text that became the first book written by a sitting U.S. Senator to make The New York Times Best Seller list since John F. Kennedy's Profiles in Courage.

== First presidential run (1988) ==
In 1988, Gore sought the Democratic Party's nomination for President of the United States. Gore carried seven states in the primaries, finishing third overall in a field that included Massachusetts Governor Michael Dukakis, then Senator Joe Biden (who would later become Vice President and then President), Gary Hart, Congressman Dick Gephardt, Paul Simon and Jesse Jackson. Dukakis eventually won the Democratic nomination and went on to lose in a landslide to George H. W. Bush in the general election. Although Gore initially denied that he intended to run, his candidacy was the subject of speculation: "National analysts make Sen. Gore a long-shot for the Presidential nomination, but many believe he could provide a natural complement for any of the other candidates: a young, attractive, moderate Vice Presidential nominee from the South. He currently denies any interest, but he carefully does not reject the idea out of hand." At the time, he was 39 years old, making him the "youngest serious Presidential candidate since John F. Kennedy".

CNN noted that, "in 1988, for the first time, 12 southern states would hold their primaries on the same day, dubbed 'Super Tuesday'. Gore thought he would be the only serious Southern contender; he had not counted on Jesse Jackson." Jackson defeated Gore in the South Carolina primary, winning, "more than half the total vote, three times that of his closest rival here, Senator Albert Gore Jr. of Tennessee". Gore next placed great hope on Super Tuesday where they split the Southern vote: Jackson winning Alabama, Georgia, Louisiana, Mississippi and Virginia; Gore winning Arkansas, North Carolina, Kentucky, Nevada, Tennessee, and Oklahoma. Gore was later endorsed by New York City Mayor Ed Koch who made statements in favor of Israel and against Jackson. These statements cast Gore in a negative light, leading voters away from Gore who received only 10% of the vote in the New York primary. Gore then dropped out of the race. The New York Times said that Gore also lost support due to his attacks against Jackson, Dukakis, and others. Gore was eventually able to mend fences with Jackson, who supported the Clinton-Gore ticket in 1992 and 1996, and campaigned for the Gore-Lieberman ticket during the 2000 presidential election. Gore's policies changed substantially in 2000, reflecting his eight years as vice president.

== 1992 vice presidential campaign ==
1992 electoral vote results. The Clinton-Gore ticket won 370–168.

Gore was initially hesitant to be Bill Clinton's running mate for the 1992 United States presidential election; after clashing with the George H. W. Bush administration over global warming issues, he decided to accept the offer. Clinton stated that he chose Gore due to his foreign policy experience, work with the environment, and commitment to his family. Clinton's choice was criticized as unconventional because rather than picking a running mate who would diversify the ticket, Clinton chose a fellow Southerner who shared his political ideologies and who was nearly the same age as Clinton. The Washington Bureau Chief for The Baltimore Sun, Paul West, later suggested that "Al Gore revolutionized the way Vice Presidents are made. When he joined Bill Clinton's ticket, it violated the old rules. Regional diversity? Not with two Southerners from neighboring states. Ideological balance? A couple of left-of-center moderates. ... And yet, Gore has come to be regarded by strategists in both parties as the best vice presidential pick in at least 20 years."

Clinton and Gore accepted the nomination at the Democratic National Convention on July 17, 1992. Known as the Baby Boomer Ticket and the Fortysomething Team, The New York Times noted that if elected, Clinton and Gore, at ages 46 and 44 respectively, would be the "youngest team to make it to the White House in the country's history". Gore called the ticket "a new generation of leadership". The ticket increased in popularity after the candidates traveled with their wives, Hillary and Tipper, on a "six-day, 1,000-mile bus ride, from New York to St. Louis". Al Gore would participate in one vice-presidential debate against Vice President Dan Quayle, and Admiral James Stockdale. That debate, as of 2023, was the only televised Vice-Presidential debate with more than two participating candidates. The Clinton-Gore ticket beat the Bush-Quayle and Perot-Stockdale tickets with 43% of the popular vote, versus their 38% and 19%, respectively. Clinton and Gore received 370 electoral votes, versus the incumbent ticket's 168, and Perot's 0.

== Vice presidency (1993–2001) ==
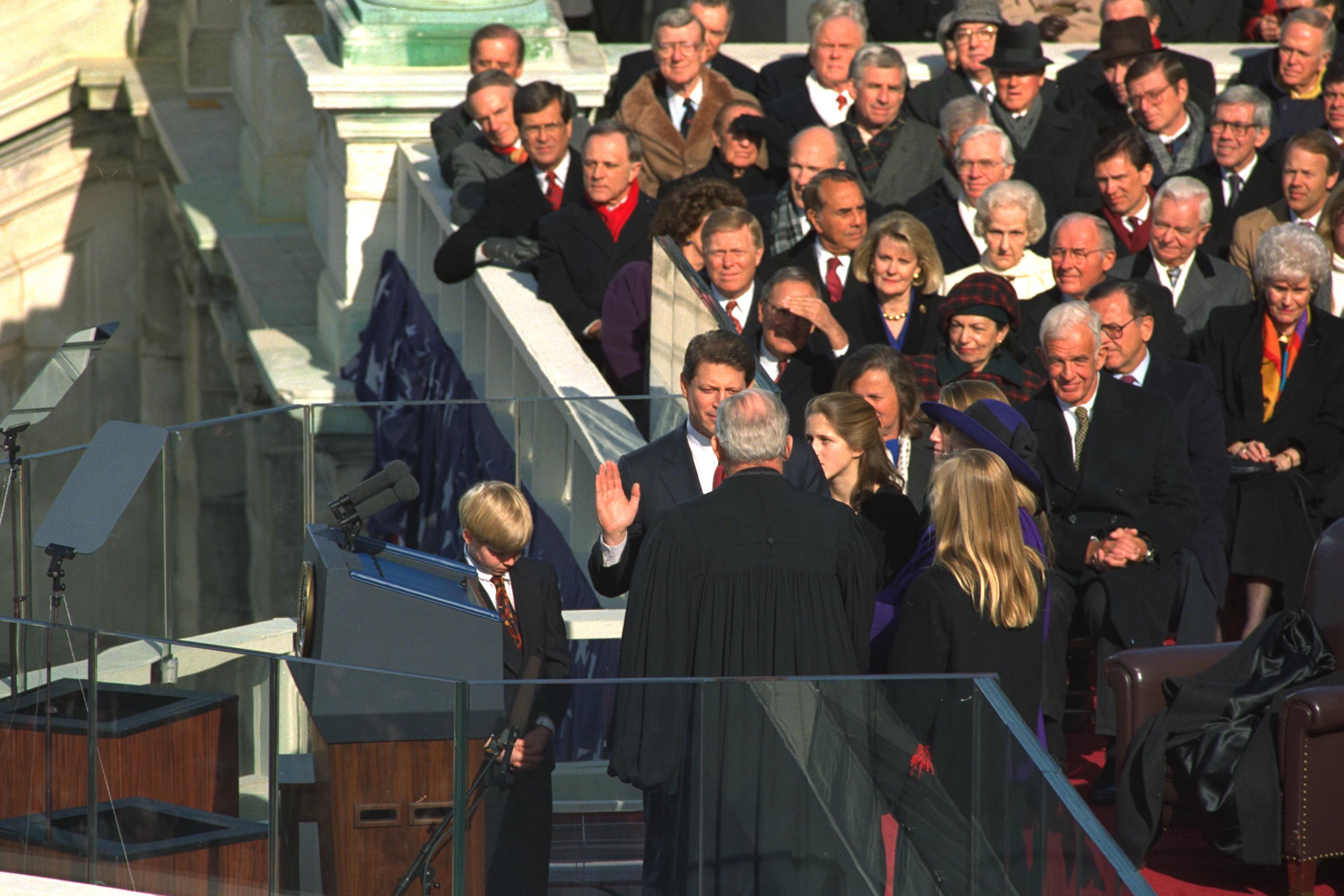
Gore being sworn in as vice president by Supreme Court Justice Byron White on January 20, 1993

Al Gore served as vice president during the Clinton administration. Clinton and Gore were inaugurated on January 20, 1993. At the beginning of the first term, they developed a "two-page agreement outlining their relationship". Clinton committed himself to regular lunch meetings; he recognized Gore as a principal adviser on nominations and appointed some of Gore's chief advisers to key White House staff positions. Clinton involved Gore in decision-making to an unprecedented degree for a vice president. Through their weekly lunches and daily conversations, Gore became the president's "indisputable chief adviser".

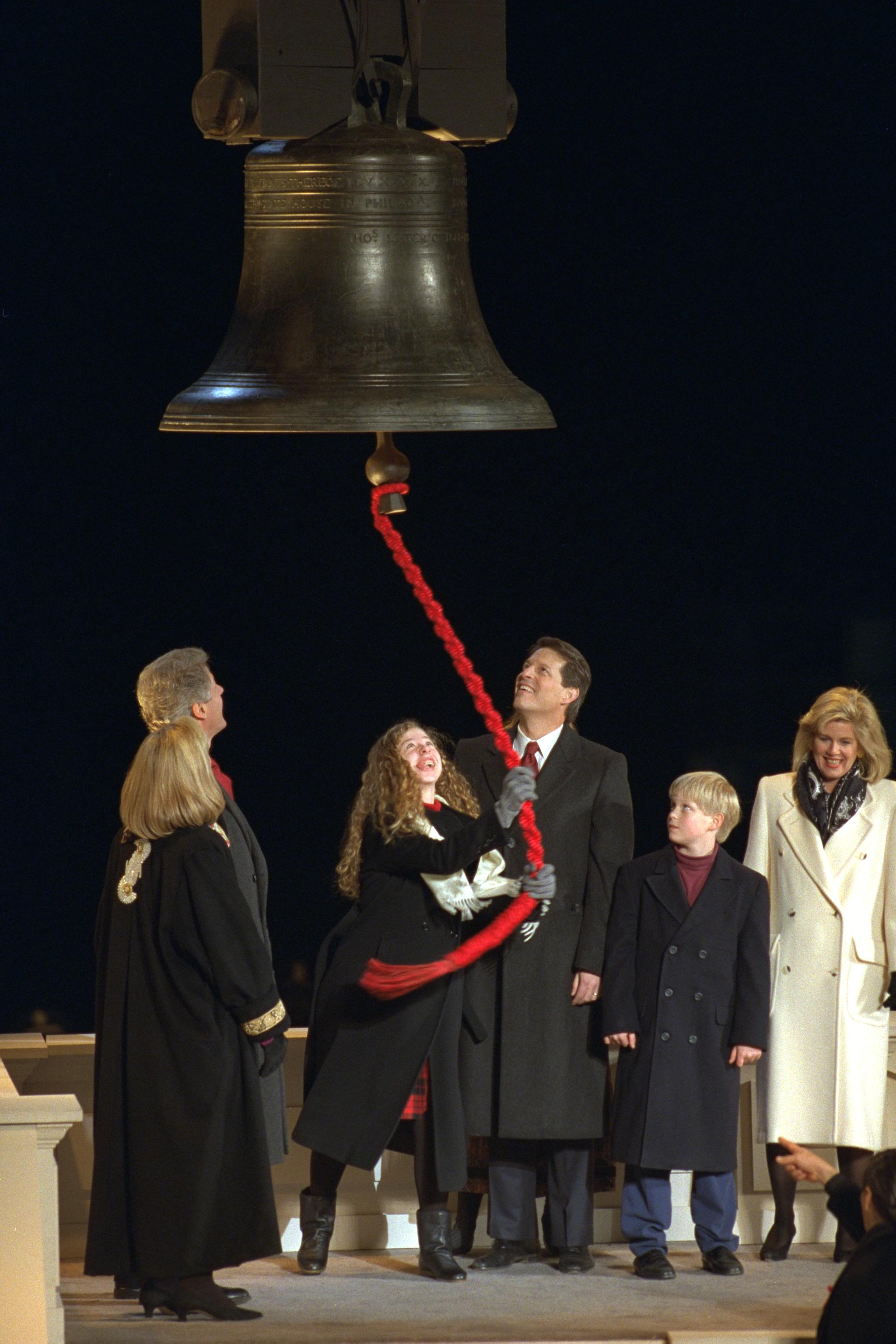
The Clintons and the Gores as Chelsea Clinton rings a replica of the Liberty Bell, 1993

Gore had to compete with First Lady Hillary for President Clinton's influence, starting when she was appointed to the health-care task force without Gore's consultation. Vanity Fair wrote that President Clinton's "failure to confide in his vice president was a telling sign of the real pecking order", and reported "it was an open secret that some of Hillary's advisers...nurtured dreams that Hillary, not Gore, would follow Bill in the presidency".

Gore had a particular interest in reducing "waste, fraud, and abuse in the federal government and advocated trimming the size of the bureaucracy and the number of regulations". During the Clinton administration, the U.S. economy expanded; according to David Greenberg (professor of history and media studies at Rutgers University), "by the end of the Clinton presidency, the numbers were uniformly impressive. Besides the record-high surpluses and the record-low poverty rates, the economy could boast the longest economic expansion in history; the lowest unemployment since the early 1970s; and the lowest poverty rates for single mothers, black Americans, and the aged." According to Leslie Budd, author of E-economy: Rhetoric or Business Reality, this economic success was due, in part, to Gore's continued role as an "Atari Democrat", promoting the development of information technology, which led to the dot-com boom. (c. 1995–2001).

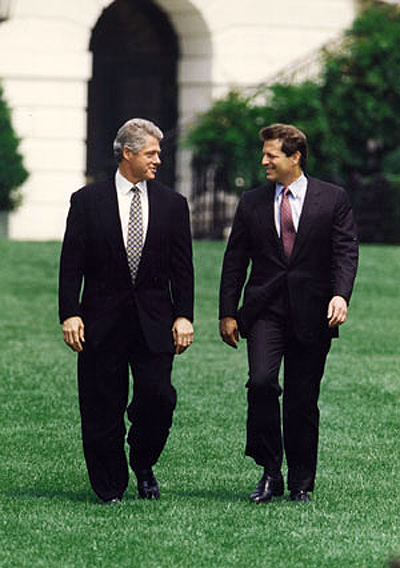
Gore and President Bill Clinton on the South Lawn, August 10, 1993

Clinton and Gore entered office planning to finance research that would "flood the economy with innovative goods and services, lifting the general level of prosperity and strengthening American industry". Their overall aim was to fund the development of, "robotics, smart roads, biotechnology, machine tools, magnetic-levitation trains, fiber-optic communications and national computer networks. Also earmarked [were] a raft of basic technologies like digital imaging and data storage." Critics claimed that the initiatives would "backfire, bloating Congressional pork and creating whole new categories of Federal waste".

During the election and his term as vice president, Gore popularized the term "Information Superhighway", which became synonymous with the Internet, and he was involved in the creation of the National Information Infrastructure. Gore first discussed his plans to emphasize information technology at UCLA on January 11, 1994, in a speech at The Superhighway Summit. On March 29, 1994, Gore made the inaugural keynote to a Georgetown University symposium on governmental reform (Note: The annual Marver H. Bernstein Symposium on Governmental Reform was established by Georgetown University in memory of Marver Bernstein, a professor at their School of Foreign Service, former president of Brandeis University, expert on public administration and author of research on the role of the federal executive.) with a lecture entitled, "The new job of the federal executive". Gore spoke on how technology was changing the nature of government, public administration, and management in general, noting that while in the past deep hierarchical structures were necessary to manage large organizations, technology was offering more accurate and streamlined access to information, thus facilitating flatter management structures. He was involved in a number of projects including NetDay '96 and 24 Hours in Cyberspace. The Clinton–Gore administration also launched the first official White House website in 1994 and subsequent versions through 2000. During 1993 and early 1994, Gore was tapped by the administration to advocate for the adoption of the Clipper Chip, a technology developed by the National Security Agency designed to provide for law enforcement access to encrypted communications. After political and technical objections, the initiative was essentially dropped.

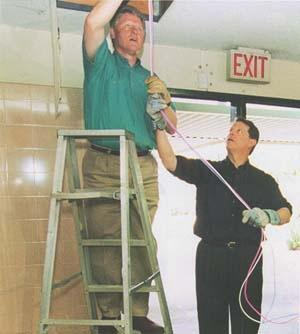
President Bill Clinton installing computer cables with Vice President Al Gore on NetDay at Ygnacio Valley High School in Concord, CA. March 9, 1996

Gore was also involved in environmental initiatives. He launched the GLOBE program on Earth Day '94, an education and science activity that, according to Forbes, "made extensive use of the Internet to increase student awareness of their environment". In 1998, Gore began promoting a NASA satellite (Deep Space Climate Observatory) that would provide a constant view of the Earth, marking the first time such an image would have been made since The Blue Marble photo from the 1972 Apollo 17 mission. During this time, he also became associated with Digital Earth.

Gore negotiated and strongly supported the Kyoto Protocol to reduce greenhouse gasses, but said upon his return that the administration would not submit the treaty to the Senate for ratification until it was amended to include "meaningful participation by key developing nations", The Senate had previously passed unanimously (95–0) the Byrd–Hagel Resolution (S. Res. 98), which declared opposition to any greenhouse gas treaty which would limit US emissions without similar limits on third-world countries such as China. The Clinton administration left office three years later without having submitted the treaty for ratification.

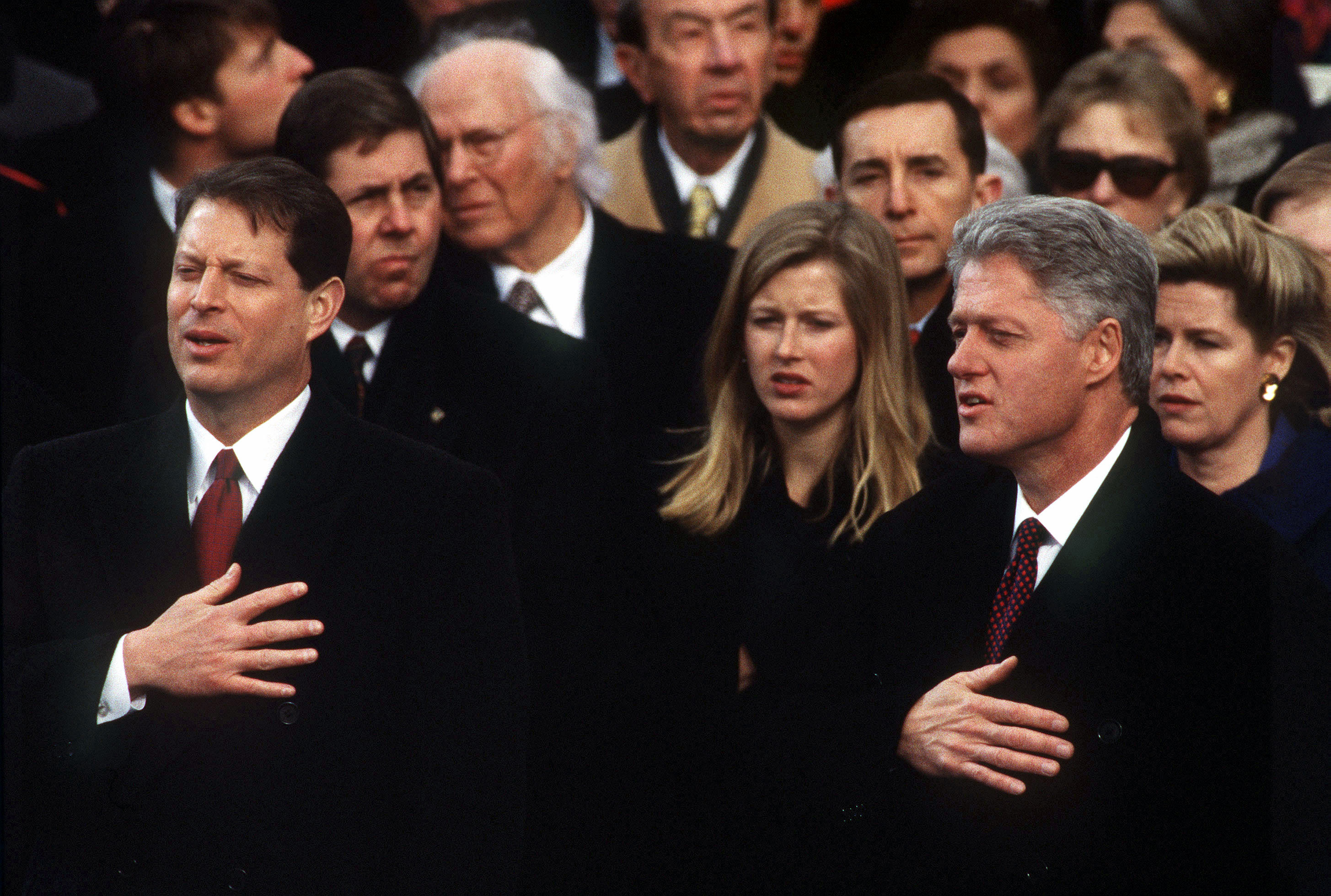
Vice President Gore and President Clinton during the second inauguration of Bill Clinton, January 20, 1997

In 1996, Gore became involved in a "Chinagate" campaign finance controversy over his attendance at an event at the Buddhist Hsi Lai Temple in Hacienda Heights, California. In an interview on NBC's Today the following year, Gore said, "I did not know that it was a fund-raiser. I knew it was a political event, and I knew there were finance people that were going to be present, and so that alone should have told me, 'This is inappropriate and this is a mistake; don't do this.' And I take responsibility for that. It was a mistake." A U.S. Department of Justice investigation into the fund-raising activities had uncovered evidence that Chinese agents sought to direct contributions from foreign sources to the Democratic National Committee (DNC) before the 1996 presidential campaign. The Chinese embassy in Washington, D.C. was used for coordinating contributions to the DNC. FBI agents were denied the opportunity to ask President Bill Clinton and Vice President Al Gore questions during Justice Department interviews in 1997 and 1998 and were allowed only to take notes.

In March 1997, Gore had to explain phone calls which he made to solicit funds for Democratic Party for the 1996 election. In a news conference, Gore stated that, "all calls that I made were charged to the Democratic National Committee. I was advised there was nothing wrong with that. My counsel tells me there is no controlling legal authority that says that is any violation of any law." The phrase "no controlling legal authority" was criticized by columnist Charles Krauthammer, who stated: "Whatever other legacies Al Gore leaves behind between now and retirement, he forever bequeaths this newest weasel word to the lexicon of American political corruption." Robert Conrad Jr. was the head of a Justice Department task force appointed by Attorney General Janet Reno to investigate Gore's fund-raising controversies. In the spring of 2000, Conrad asked Reno to appoint an independent counsel to continue the investigation. After looking into the matter, Reno judged that the appointment of an independent counsel was unwarranted.

During the 1990s, Gore spoke out on a number of issues. In a 1992 speech on the Gulf War, Gore stated that he twice attempted to get the U.S. government to pull the plug on support to Saddam Hussein, citing Hussein's use of poison gas, support of terrorism, and his burgeoning nuclear program, but was opposed both times by the Reagan and Bush administrations. In 1998, at a conference of APEC hosted by Malaysia, Gore objected to the indictment, arrest and jailing of Prime Minister Mahathir Mohamad's longtime second-in-command Anwar Ibrahim, a move which received a negative response from leaders there. Ten years later, Gore again protested when Ibrahim was arrested a second time, a decision condemned by Malaysian foreign minister Datuk Seri Dr Rais Yatim.

1996 electoral vote results. The Clinton-Gore ticket won 379–159.

In the 1996 presidential election, Clinton and Gore both ran for re-election for president and vice-president. They faced Republican Senate Majority Leader Bob Dole, with his running mate, Jack Kemp, a former member of House republican leadership and George H. W. Bush's secretary of Housing and Urban Development. Gore and Kemp debated once, in one of the lowest rated debates in history. Gore held his own against Kemp, and kept President Clinton's large lead against Dole stable. On November 5, 1996, Clinton and Gore were re-elected as president and vice-president with 379 electoral votes and an 8% margin of victory in the popular vote.

Soon afterward, Gore also had to contend with the Clinton–Lewinsky scandal, which involved an affair between President Clinton and a White House intern, Monica Lewinsky. Gore initially defended Clinton, whom he believed to be innocent, stating: "He is the president of the country! He is my friend ... I want to ask you now, every single one of you, to join me in supporting him." After Clinton was impeached, Gore continued to defend him, stating: "I've defined my job in exactly the same way for six years now ... to do everything I can to help him be the best president possible."

== 2000 presidential campaign ==
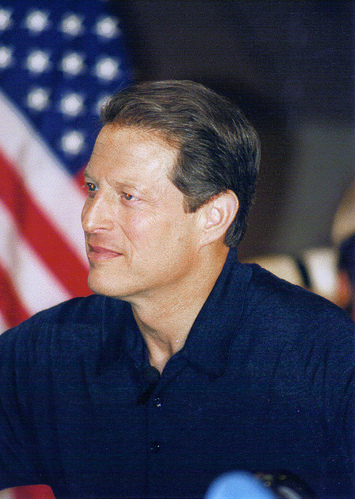
In Manchester, New Hampshire, campaigning for President of the United States in 2000

During a speech that he gave on June 16, 1999, in Carthage, Tennessee, Gore formally announced his candidacy for president. His major theme was the need to strengthen the American family. He was introduced by his eldest daughter, Karenna Gore Schiff. In making the speech, Gore also distanced himself from Bill Clinton, who he stated had lied to him. Gore was "briefly interrupted" by AIDS protesters claiming Gore was working with the pharmaceutical industry to prevent access to generic medicines for poor nations and chanting "Gore's greed kills". Additional speeches were also interrupted by the protesters. Gore responded: "I love this country. I love the First Amendment ... Let me say in response to those who may have chosen an inappropriate way to make their point, that actually the crisis of AIDS in Africa is one that should command the attention of people in the United States and around the world." Gore also issued a statement saying that he supported efforts to lower the cost of the AIDS drugs, provided that they "are done in a way consistent with international agreements".

While Bill Clinton's job-approval ratings were around 60%, an April 1999 study by the Pew Research Center for the People found that respondents suffered from "Clinton fatigue" where they were "tired of all the problems associated with the Clinton administration" including the Lewinsky scandal and impeachment. Texas Governor and likely Republican presidential nominee George W. Bush was leading Gore 54% to 41% in polls during that time. Gore's advisers believed that the "Lewinsky scandal and Bill's past womanizing...alienated independent voters—especially the soccer moms, who stood for traditional values". Consequently, Gore's presidential campaign "veered too far in differentiating himself from Bill and his record and had difficulty taking advantage of the Clinton administration's legitimate successes". In addition, Hillary's candidacy for the open Senate seat in New York exacerbated the "three-way tensions evident in the White House since 1993", as "not only was Hillary unavailable as a campaigner, she was poaching top Democratic fund-raisers and donors who would normally concentrate on the vice president". In one instance "Hillary insisted on being invited [to a Los Angeles fundraiser for the vice president]—over the objections of the event's organizers", where the First Lady "shocked the vice president's supporters by soliciting donations for herself in front of Tipper".

Gore faced an early challenge by former New Jersey senator Bill Bradley. Bradley was the only candidate to oppose Gore and was considered a "fresh face" for the White House. Gore challenged Bradley to a series of debates which took the form of "town hall" meetings. Gore went on the offensive during these debates leading to a drop in the polls for Bradley. In the Iowa caucus the unions pledged their support to Gore, despite Bradley spending heavily in that state, and Bradley was much embarrassed by his two to one defeat there. Gore went on to capture the New Hampshire primary 53-47%, which had been a must-win state for Bradley. Gore then swept all of the primaries on Super Tuesday while Bradley finished a distant second in each state. On March 9, 2000, after failing to win any of the first 20 primaries and caucuses in the election process, Bradley withdrew his campaign and endorsed Gore. Gore eventually went on to win every primary and caucus and, in March 2000 even won the first primary election ever held over the Internet, the Arizona Presidential Primary. By then, he secured the Democratic nomination. As of 2023, Al Gore remains the only presidential candidate in American history who was not the incumbent president to win every single contest in his or her party primary.

The logo for Gore and Joe Lieberman's campaign

On August 13, 2000, Gore announced that he had selected Senator Joe Lieberman of Connecticut as his vice presidential running mate. Lieberman became "the first person of the Jewish faith to run for the nation's second-highest office". Many pundits saw Gore's choice of Lieberman as further distancing him from the scandals of the Clinton White House. Gore's daughter, Karenna, together with her father's former Harvard roommate Tommy Lee Jones, officially nominated Gore as the Democratic presidential candidate during the 2000 Democratic National Convention in Los Angeles, California. Gore accepted his party's nomination and spoke about the major themes of his campaign, stating in particular his plan to extend Medicare to pay for prescription drugs and to work for a sensible universal health-care system. Soon after the convention, Gore hit the campaign trail with running mate Joe Lieberman. Gore and Bush were deadlocked in the polls. They participated in three televised debates. While both sides claimed victory after each, Gore was critiqued as either too stiff, too reticent, or too aggressive in contrast to Bush.

=== Inventing the internet ===
There was talk of a potential run in the 2000 presidential race by Gore as early as January 1998. Gore discussed the possibility of running during a March 9, 1999, interview with CNN's Late Edition with Wolf Blitzer. In response to Wolf Blitzer's question: "Why should Democrats, looking at the Democratic nomination process, support you instead of Bill Bradley", Gore responded:

I'll be offering my vision when my campaign begins. And it will be comprehensive and sweeping. And I hope that it will be compelling enough to draw people toward it. I feel that it will be. But it will emerge from my dialogue with the American people. I've traveled to every part of this country during the last six years. During my service in the United States Congress, I took the initiative in creating the Internet. I took the initiative in moving forward a whole range of initiatives that have proven to be important to our country's economic growth and environmental protection, improvements in our educational system.

Former UCLA professor of information studies Philip E. Agre and journalist Eric Boehlert argued that three articles in Wired News led to the creation of the widely spread urban legend that Gore claimed to have "invented the Internet", which followed this interview. In addition, computer professionals and congressional colleagues argued in his defense. Internet pioneers Vint Cerf and Bob Kahn stated that "we don't think, as some people have argued, that Gore intended to claim he 'invented' the Internet. Moreover, there is no question in our minds that while serving as Senator, Gore's initiatives had a significant and beneficial effect on the still-evolving Internet." Cerf would later state: "Al Gore had seen what happened with the National Interstate and Defense Highways Act of 1956, which his father introduced as a military bill. It was very powerful. Housing went up, suburban boom happened, everybody became mobile. Al was attuned to the power of networking much more than any of his elective colleagues. His initiatives led directly to the commercialization of the Internet. So he really does deserve credit."

In a speech to the American Political Science Association, former Republican Speaker of the House of Representatives Newt Gingrich stated: "In all fairness, it's something Gore had worked on a long time. Gore is not the Father of the Internet, but in all fairness, Gore is the person who, in the Congress, most systematically worked to make sure that we got to an Internet, and the truth is—and I worked with him starting in 1978 when I got [to Congress], we were both part of a "futures group"—the fact is, in the Clinton administration, the world we had talked about in the '80s began to actually happen." Finally, Wolf Blitzer (who conducted the original 1999 interview) stated in 2008 that: "I didn't ask him about the Internet. I asked him about the differences he had with Bill Bradley ... Honestly, at the time, when he said it, it didn't dawn on me that this was going to have the impact that it wound up having, because it was distorted to a certain degree and people said they took what he said, which was a carefully phrased comment about taking the initiative and creating the Internet to—I invented the Internet. And that was the sort of shorthand, the way his enemies projected it and it wound up being a devastating setback to him and it hurt him, as I'm sure he acknowledges to this very day."

Gore himself would later poke fun at the controversy. In 2000, while on the Late Show with David Letterman he read Letterman's Top 10 List (which for this show was called, "Top Ten Rejected Gore – Lieberman Campaign Slogans") to the audience. Number nine on the list was: "Remember, America, I gave you the Internet, and I can take it away!" In 2005, when Gore was awarded the Lifetime Achievement Award "for three decades of contributions to the Internet" at the Webby Awards, he joked in his acceptance speech (limited to five words according to Webby Awards rules): "Please don't recount this vote." He was introduced by Vint Cerf who used the same format to joke: "We all invented the Internet." Gore, who was then asked to add a few more words to his speech, stated: "It is time to reinvent the Internet for all of us to make it more robust and much more accessible and use it to reinvigorate our democracy."

=== Recount ===
On election night, news networks first called Florida for Gore, later retracted the projection, and then called Florida for Bush, before finally retracting that projection as well. Florida's Republican Secretary of State, Katherine Harris, eventually certified Florida's vote count. This led to the Florida election recount, a move to further examine the Florida results. The Florida recount was stopped a few weeks later on December 12 by the U.S. Supreme Court. In the ruling, Bush v. Gore, the Justices held, by a 7–2 vote, that the standards the Florida Supreme Court provided for a recount were unconstitutional due to violations of the Equal Protection Clause of the Fourteenth Amendment, and further ruled 5–4 that no constitutionally valid recount could be completed by the December 12 deadline. That ended recounts underway in selected Florida counties, resulting in George W. Bush with a 537 vote victory in Florida and consequently Florida's 25 electoral votes, thus the presidency. The results of the decision led to Gore winning the popular vote by approximately 500,000 votes nationwide, but receiving 266 electoral votes to Bush's 271 (one District of Columbia elector abstained). On December 13, 2000, Gore conceded the election. Gore strongly disagreed with the Court's decision, but in his concession speech stated that, "for the sake of our unity as a people and the strength of our democracy, I offer my concession."

== Post-vice presidency (2001–present) ==
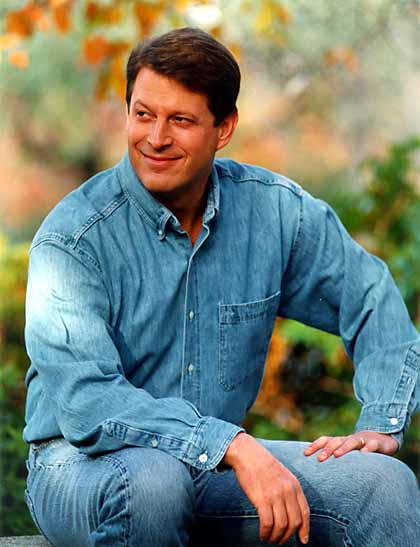
Gore in 2000

Bill Clinton and Gore had maintained an informal public distance for eight years, but they reunited for the media in August 2009. Clinton had arranged for the release of two female journalists who were being held hostage in North Korea. The women were employees of Gore's Current TV. In May 2018, he was included as a member of the Indian Government committee to coordinate year long celebrations of Mahatma Gandhi's 150th birth anniversary from October 2, 2019.

=== Criticism of Bush ===
Beginning in 2002, Gore began to publicly criticize the Bush administration. In a September 23 speech that he gave before the Commonwealth Club of California, Gore criticized Bush and Congress for the rush to war prior to the outbreak of hostilities in Iraq. He compared this decision to the Persian Gulf War (which Gore had voted for), stating, "Back in 1991, I was one of a handful of Democrats in the United States Senate to vote in favor of the resolution endorsing the Persian Gulf War ... But look at the differences between the resolution that was voted on in 1991 and the one this administration is proposing that the Congress vote on in 2002. The circumstances are really completely different ... in 1991, Iraq had crossed an international border, invaded a neighboring sovereign nation and annexed its territory. Now by contrast in 2002, there has been no such invasion." The following November, Gore told CNN that he supported regime change in Iraq but opposed the Bush administration's apparent haste to achieve it, stating that "we should have built the international coalition first, instead of distracting attention and shifting time, effort and energy away from the war on terror. If you're going after Jesse James, you ought to organize the posse first, instead of riding off by yourself." Gore additionally criticized the Saddam Hussein and al-Qaeda link allegations, calling such claims nebulous, and argued that the administration's shift in priority from the manhunt for Osama bin Laden and military action against al-Qaeda prevented the United States from achieving a swift and firm victory in the war in Afghanistan.

In a speech given during the 2004 presidential election, Gore accused George W. Bush of betraying the country by using the 9/11 attacks as a justification for the invasion of Iraq. The next year, Gore gave a speech which covered many topics, including what he called "religious zealots" who claim special knowledge of God's will in American politics. Gore stated: "They even claim that those of us who disagree with their point of view are waging war against people of faith." After Hurricane Katrina in 2005, Gore chartered two planes to evacuate 270 people from New Orleans and criticized the Bush administration's response to the hurricane. In 2006, Gore criticized Bush's use of domestic wiretaps without a warrant. One month later, in a speech given at the Jeddah Economic Forum, Gore criticized the treatment of Arabs in the U.S. after 9/11 stating, "Unfortunately there have been terrible abuses and it's wrong ... I do want you to know that it does not represent the desires or wishes or feelings of the majority of the citizens of my country."

Gore's 2007 book, The Assault on Reason, is an analysis of what Gore refers to as the "emptying out of the marketplace of ideas" in civic discourse during the Bush administration. He attributes this phenomenon to the influence of television and argues that it endangers American democracy. By contrast, Gore argues, the Internet can revitalize and ultimately "redeem the integrity of representative democracy". In 2008, Gore argued against the ban of same-sex marriage on his Current TV website, stating, "I think that gay men and women ought to have the same rights as heterosexual men and women to make contracts, have hospital visiting rights, and join together in marriage." In a 2009 interview with CNN, Gore commented on former Vice President Dick Cheney's criticism of the Obama administration. Referring to his own previous criticism of the Bush administrations, Gore stated: "I waited two years after I left office to make statements that were critical, and then of the policy ... You know, you talk about somebody that shouldn't be talking about making the country less safe, invading a country that did not attack us and posed no serious threat to us at all."

While Gore has criticized Bush for his Katrina response, he has not spoken publicly about his part in the evacuation of 270 patients on September 3 & 4, 2005, from Charity Hospital in New Orleans to Tennessee. On September 1, Gore was contacted by Charity Hospital's Neurosurgeon Dr. David Kline, who had operated on his son Albert, through Greg Simon of FasterCures. Kline informed Gore and Simon of the desperate conditions at the hospital and asked Gore and Simon to arrange relief. On Gore's personal financial commitment, two airlines each provided a plane with one flight later underwritten by Larry Flax. The flights were flown by volunteer airline crews and medically staffed by Gore's cousin, retired Col. Dar LaFon, and family physician Dr. Anderson Spickard and were accompanied by Gore and Albert III. Gore used his political influence to expedite landing rights in New Orleans.

=== Presidential run speculation ===
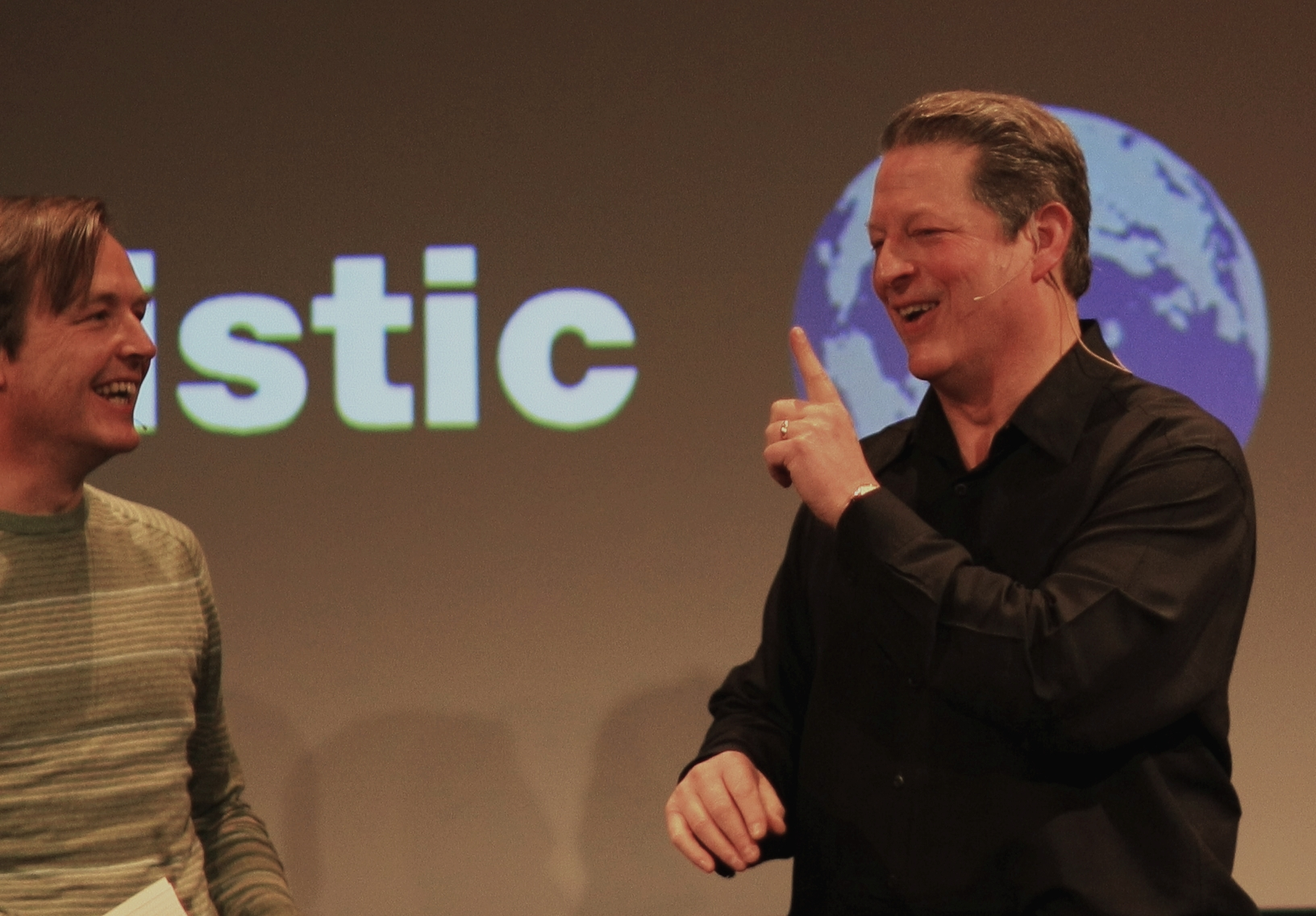
In 2008, Chris Anderson asked: "Will you run again?" Gore replied, "Oh, you aren't going to get me on this one!"

People were speculating that Gore would be a candidate for the 2004 presidential election (a bumper sticker, "Re-elect Gore in 2004!" was popular). On December 16, 2002, however, Gore announced that he would not run in 2004. While Gore seriously considered challenging Bush in 2004, the September 11 attacks and the subsequent stratospheric rise in President Bush's popularity as a result of his response to these attacks were strong factors in Gore's December 2002 decision not to run again in 2004. Despite Gore taking himself out of the race, a handful of his supporters formed a national campaign to draft him into running. The draft movement, however, failed to convince Gore to run.

The prospect of a Gore candidacy arose again between 2006 and early 2008 in light of the upcoming 2008 presidential election. Although Gore frequently stated that he had "no plans to run", he did not reject the possibility of future involvement in politics which led to speculation that he might run. This was due in part to his increased popularity after the release of the 2006 documentary, An Inconvenient Truth. The director of the film, Davis Guggenheim, stated that after the release of the film, "Everywhere I go with him, they treat him like a rock star." After An Inconvenient Truth was nominated for an Academy Award, Donna Brazile (Gore's campaign chairwoman from his 2000 campaign) speculated that Gore might announce a possible presidential candidacy during the Oscars.

During the 79th Academy Awards ceremony, Gore and actor Leonardo DiCaprio shared the stage to speak about the "greening" of the ceremony itself. Gore began to give a speech that appeared to be leading up to an announcement that he would run for president. However, background music drowned him out and he was escorted offstage, implying that it was a rehearsed gag, which he later acknowledged. After An Inconvenient Truth won the Academy Award for Best Documentary, speculation increased about a possible presidential run. Gore's popularity was indicated in polls which showed that even without running, he was coming in second or third among possible Democratic candidates Hillary Clinton, Barack Obama, and John Edwards. Grassroots draft campaigns also developed with the hope that they could encourage Gore to run. Gore, however, remained firm in his decision and declined to run for the presidency. Interest in having Gore run for the 2016 presidential election arose in 2014 and again in 2015, although he did not declare any intention to do so.

=== Involvement in presidential campaigns ===
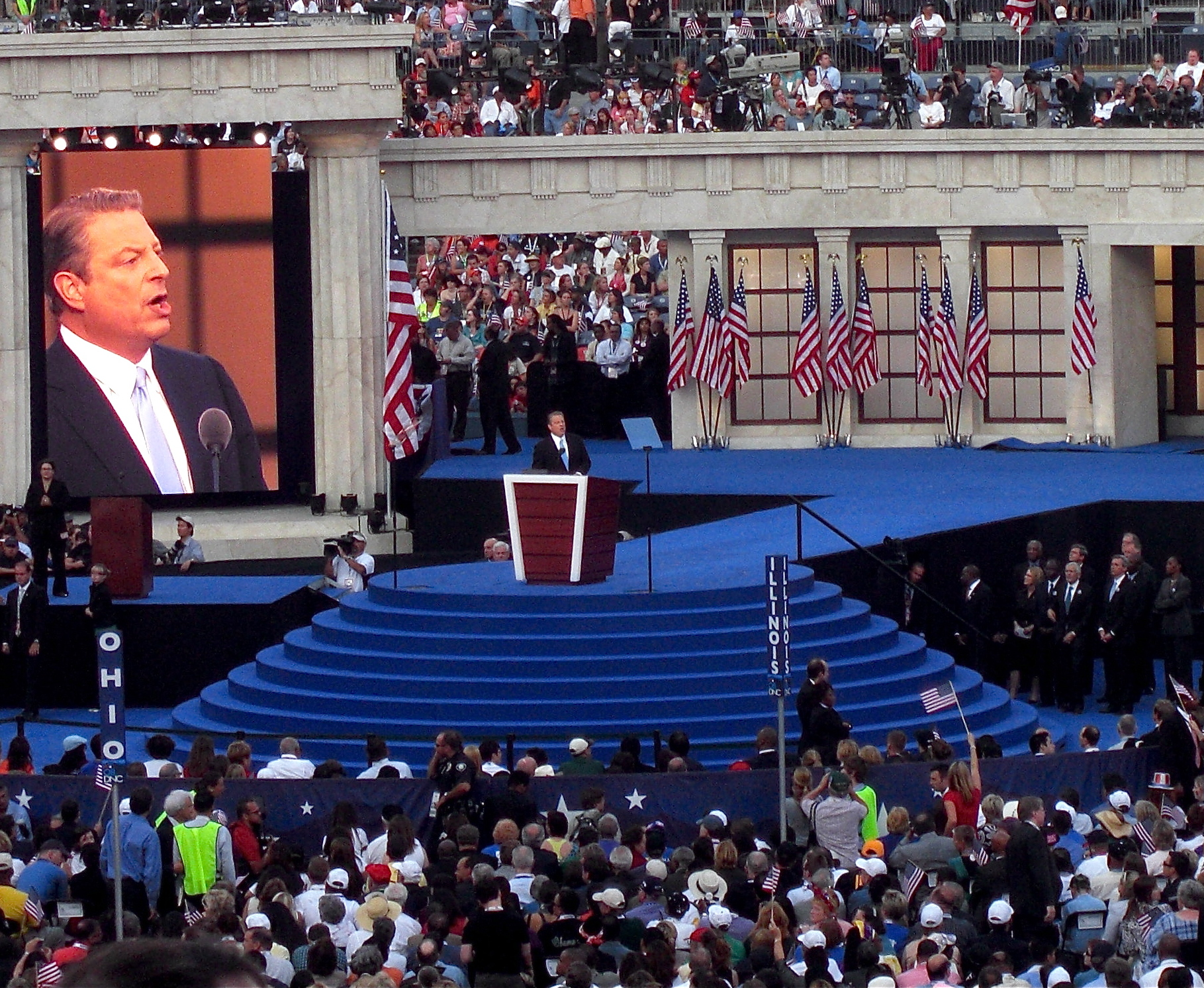
Gore speaks during the final day of the 2008 Democratic National Convention in Denver, Colorado.

After announcing he would not run in the 2004 U.S. presidential election, Gore endorsed Vermont governor Howard Dean in December 2003, weeks before the first primary of the election cycle. He was criticized for this endorsement by eight Democratic contenders particularly since he did not endorse his former running mate Joe Lieberman (Gore preferred Dean over Lieberman because Lieberman supported the Iraq War and Gore did not). Dean's campaign soon became a target of attacks and eventually failed, with Gore's early endorsement being credited as a factor. In The New York Times, Dean stated, "I actually do think the endorsement of Al Gore began the decline", and the Times further noted that "Dean instantly amplified his statement to indicate that the endorsement from Mr. Gore, a powerhouse of the establishment, so threatened the other Democratic candidates that they began the attacks on his candidacy that helped derail it." Dean's former campaign manager, Joe Trippi, also stated that after Gore's endorsement of Dean, "alarm bells went off in every newsroom in the country, in every other campaign in the country", indicating that if something did not change, Dean would be the nominee. Later in March 2004, Gore endorsed John Kerry and gave Kerry $6 million in funds left over from his own unsuccessful 2000 bid. Gore also opened the 2004 Democratic National Convention.

During the 2008 primaries, Gore remained neutral toward all of the candidates, which led to speculation that he would come out of a brokered 2008 Democratic National Convention as a "compromise candidate" if the party decided it could not nominate one. Gore responded by stating that these events would not take place because a candidate would be nominated through the primary process. Senator Ted Kennedy had urged Gore to endorse Senator Barack Obama, though Gore declined. When Obama became the presumptive Democratic nominee for president on June 3, 2008, speculation began that Gore might be tapped for the vice presidency. On June 16, 2008, one week after Hillary Clinton had suspended her campaign, Gore endorsed Obama in a speech given in Detroit, Michigan which renewed speculation of an Obama-Gore ticket. Gore stated that he was not interested in being vice president again. On the timing and nature of Gore's endorsement, some argued that Gore waited because he did not want to repeat his calamitous early endorsement of Howard Dean during the 2004 presidential election.

On the final night of the 2008 Democratic National Convention, shortly before Obama delivered his acceptance address, Gore gave a speech offering his full support. Such support led to new speculation after Obama was elected president during the 2008 presidential election that Gore would be named a member of the Obama administration. This speculation was enhanced by a meeting held between Obama, Gore, and Joe Biden in Chicago on December 9, 2008. However, Democratic officials and Gore's spokeswoman stated that during the meeting the only subject under discussion was the climate crisis, and Gore would not be joining the Obama administration. On December 19, 2008, Gore described Obama's environmental administrative choices of Carol Browner, Steven Chu, and Lisa Jackson as "an exceptional team to lead the fight against the climate crisis". Gore repeated his neutrality eight years later during the Democratic presidential primaries of 2016 until endorsing Hillary Clinton on July 25, 2016, the first day of that year's Democratic National Convention. Gore appeared with her at a rally on Miami Dade College's Kendall Campus on October 11, 2016.

=== Environmentalism ===
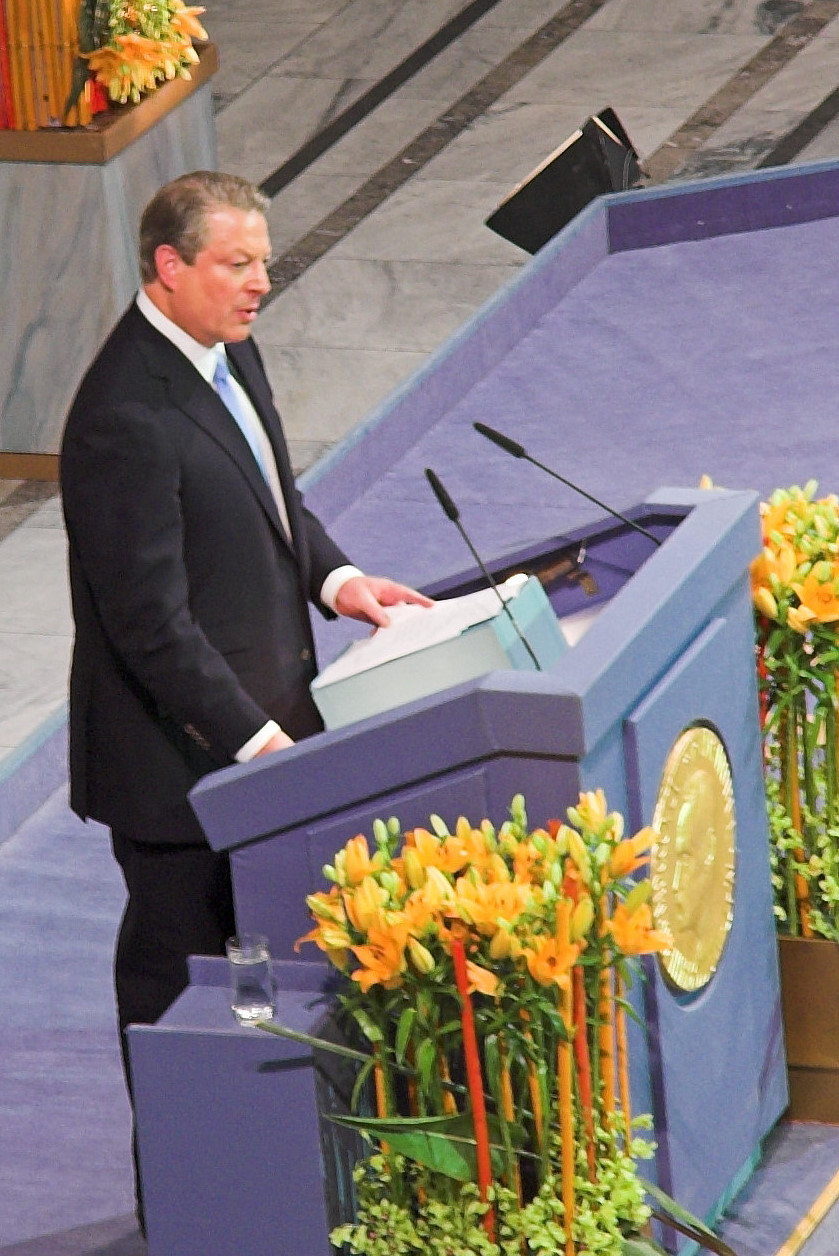
Gore receives the Nobel Peace Prize in the city hall of Oslo, 2007.

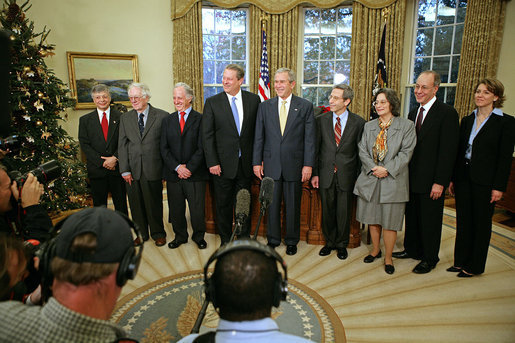
President George W. Bush meets with Al Gore and the other 2007 Nobel Award recipients, November 26, 2007.

Gore has been involved with environmental issues since 1976 when as a freshman congressman, he held the "first congressional hearings on the climate change, and co-sponsor[ed] hearings on toxic waste and global warming". He continued to speak on the topic throughout the 1980s, and is still prevalent in the environmental community. He was known as one of the Atari Democrats, later called the "Democrats' Greens, politicians who see issues like clean air, clean water and global warming as the key to future victories for their party".

In 1990, Senator Gore presided over a three-day conference with legislators from over 42 countries which sought to create a Global Marshall Plan, "under which industrial nations would help less developed countries grow economically while still protecting the environment". In the late 1990s, Gore strongly pushed for the passage of the Kyoto Protocol, which called for the reduction in greenhouse gas emissions. He was opposed by the Senate, which passed unanimously (95–0) the Byrd–Hagel Resolution (S. Res. 98), which stated the sense of the Senate was that the United States should not be a signatory to any protocol that did not include binding targets and timetables for developing as well as industrialized nations or "would result in serious harm to the economy of the United States".

In 2004, Gore co-launched Generation Investment Management, a company for which he serves as chair. A few years later, Gore would also found the Alliance for Climate Protection, an organization which eventually founded the We Campaign. Gore would also become a partner in the venture capital firm, Kleiner Perkins Caufield & Byers, heading that firm's climate change solutions group. He also helped to organize the Live Earth benefit concerts. In 2010, he attended WE Day (Vancouver, Canada), a WE Charity event. He favors replacing the income tax with a carbon tax: "We should tax what we burn, not what we earn. This is the single most important policy change we can make."

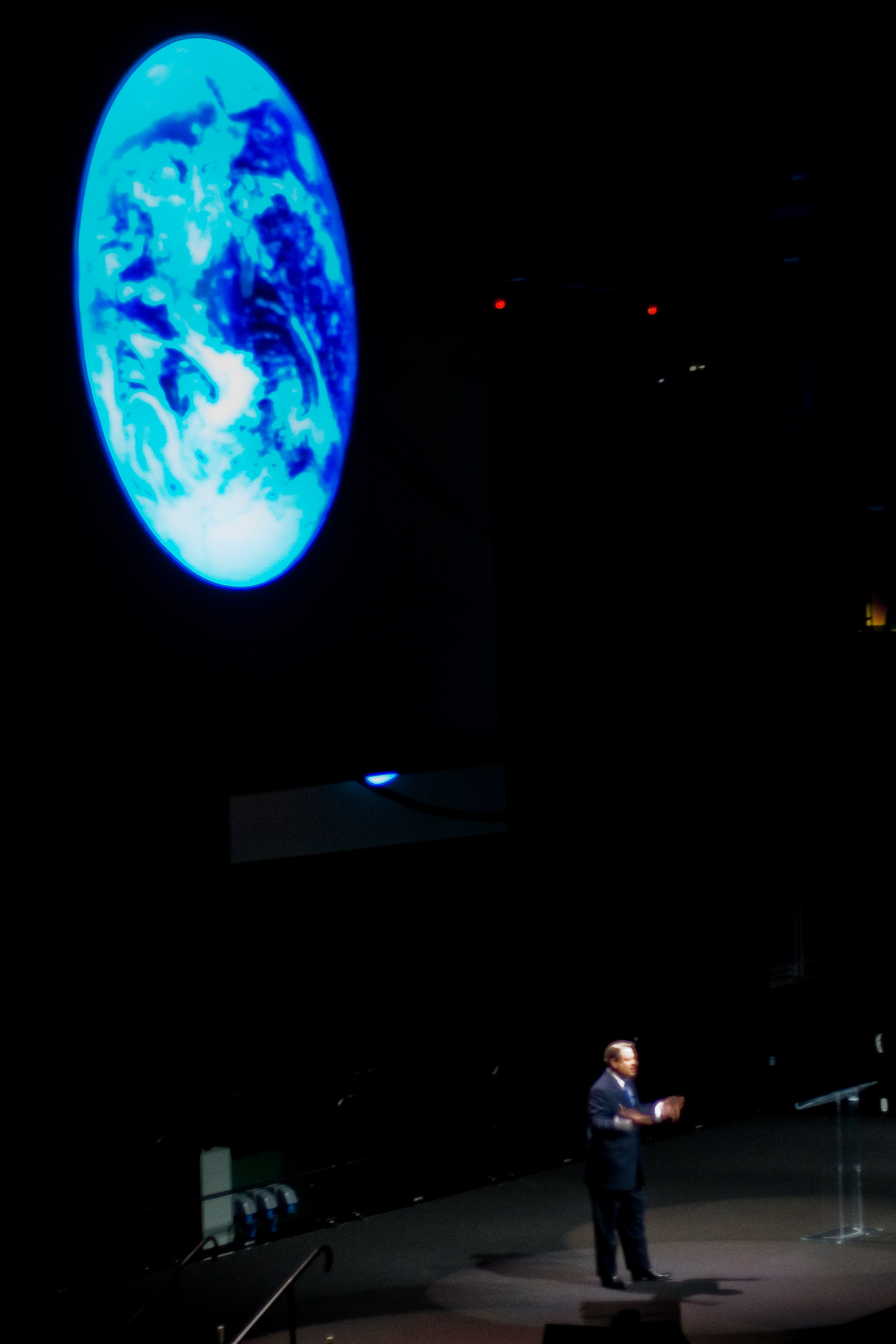
Gore's speech on Global Warming at the University of Miami BankUnited Center, February 28, 2007

In 2013, Gore became a vegan. He had earlier admitted that "it's absolutely correct that the growing meat intensity of diets across the world is one of the issues connected to this global crisis – not only because of the [carbon dioxide] involved, but also because of the water consumed in the process" and some speculate that his adoption of the new diet is related to his environmentalist stance. In a 2014 interview, Gore said: "Over a year ago I changed my diet to a vegan diet, really just to experiment to see what it was like. ... I felt better, so I've continued with it and I'm likely to continue it for the rest of my life."

Gore's An Inconvenient Sequel: Truth to Power, a sequel to his 2006 film, An Inconvenient Truth, premiered at the 2017 Sundance Film Festival. The film documents his continuing efforts to battle climate change. A "Climate and Health Summit" which was originally going to be held by the Centers for Disease Control and Prevention, was cancelled without warning in late January 2017. A few days later, Gore revived the summit, which was held by the Climate Reality Project without the support of the CDC. In 2020, he helped to launch Climate TRACE to independently monitor global greenhouse gas emissions. In November 2021, Gore spoke at the early stages of the 2021 United Nations Climate Change Conference (COP26) in Glasgow, Scotland. He later criticised the Morrison government for failing to increase Australia's 2030 emissions reduction target.

=== Criticism ===
In the late 1980s and 1990s, Gore was criticized for his involvement in asking the EPA for less strict pollution controls for the Pigeon River, which had long been polluted by a paper mill in Canton, North Carolina. A number of people and organizations, including Marsha Blackburn, a current U.S. Senator and former Congresswoman from Tennessee, and a conservative Washington, D.C. think tank, have claimed that Gore has a conflict of interest for advocating for taxpayer subsidies of green-energy technologies in which he has a personal investment. Additionally, he has been criticized for his above-average energy consumption in using private jets, and in owning multiple, very large homes, one of which was reported in 2007 as using high amounts of electricity. Gore's spokesperson responded by stating that the Gores use renewable energy which is more expensive than regular energy and that the Tennessee house in question has been retrofitted to make it more energy efficient.

Data in An Inconvenient Truth has been questioned. In a 2007 court case, a British judge said that while he had "no doubt ...the film was broadly accurate" and its "four main scientific hypotheses ...are supported by a vast quantity of research", he upheld nine of a "long schedule" of alleged errors presented to the court. He ruled that the film could be shown to schoolchildren in the UK if guidance notes given to teachers were amended to balance out the film's one-sided political views. Gore's spokesperson responded in 2007 that the court had upheld the film's fundamental thesis and its use as an educational tool. In 2009, Gore described the British court ruling as being "in my favor".

During the COP15 climate change conference in Copenhagen in 2009, Gore cited research from Wieslaw Maslowski, a professor of oceanography at the Naval Postgraduate School in California to claim that "Some of the models suggest to Maslowski that there is a 75% chance that the entire north polar ice cap during some of the summer months could be completely ice-free within the next five to seven years." However, a fact-check conducted by Reuters found that Gore was guilty of misrepresenting scientific data or "spreading misinformation". In a 2009 interview with The Sunday Times, Maslowski responded to Gore's claim by saying: "It's unclear to me how this figure was arrived at. I would never try to estimate likelihood at anything as exact as this." Gore was also criticized when in 2012 he sold his television channel Current TV for around $100 million to Al Jazeera, a media company funded by the government of Qatar, a nation largely dependent on income from the fossil fuel industry.

== Personal life ==
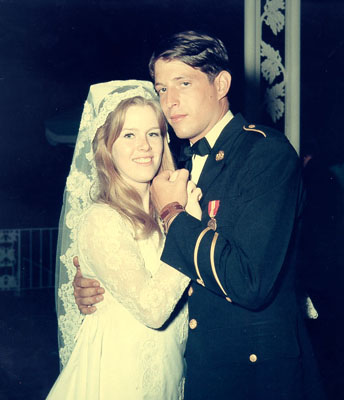
Tipper and Al Gore on their wedding day, May 19, 1970, at the Washington National Cathedral

Gore met Mary Elizabeth "Tipper" Aitcheson at his St. Albans senior prom in 1965. She was from the nearby St. Agnes School. Tipper followed Gore to Boston to attend college, and they married at the Washington National Cathedral on May 19, 1970. They have four children; Karenna Gore (b. 1973), Kristin Carlson Gore (b. 1977), Sarah LaFon Gore (b. 1979) and Albert Arnold Gore III (b. 1982). In June 2010, the Gores announced in an e-mail to friends that after "long and careful consideration", they had made a mutual decision to separate. In May 2012, it was reported that Gore had started dating Elizabeth Keadle of Rancho Santa Fe, California.

Before beginning his political career, he attended the New Salem Missionary Baptist Church in Elmwood, Tennessee. In 1977, when he moved to Arlington County, Virginia, he attended the Mount Vernon Baptist Church. He and his wife were baptized in 1980 and became members of the church. In 2004, he announced he had left the Southern Baptist Convention, but remained a Baptist. In 2007, he received Ethics Daily's "Baptist of the Year" award for his environmental activism. He was a keynote speaker at the 2008 New Baptist Covenant convention.

== Awards and honors ==
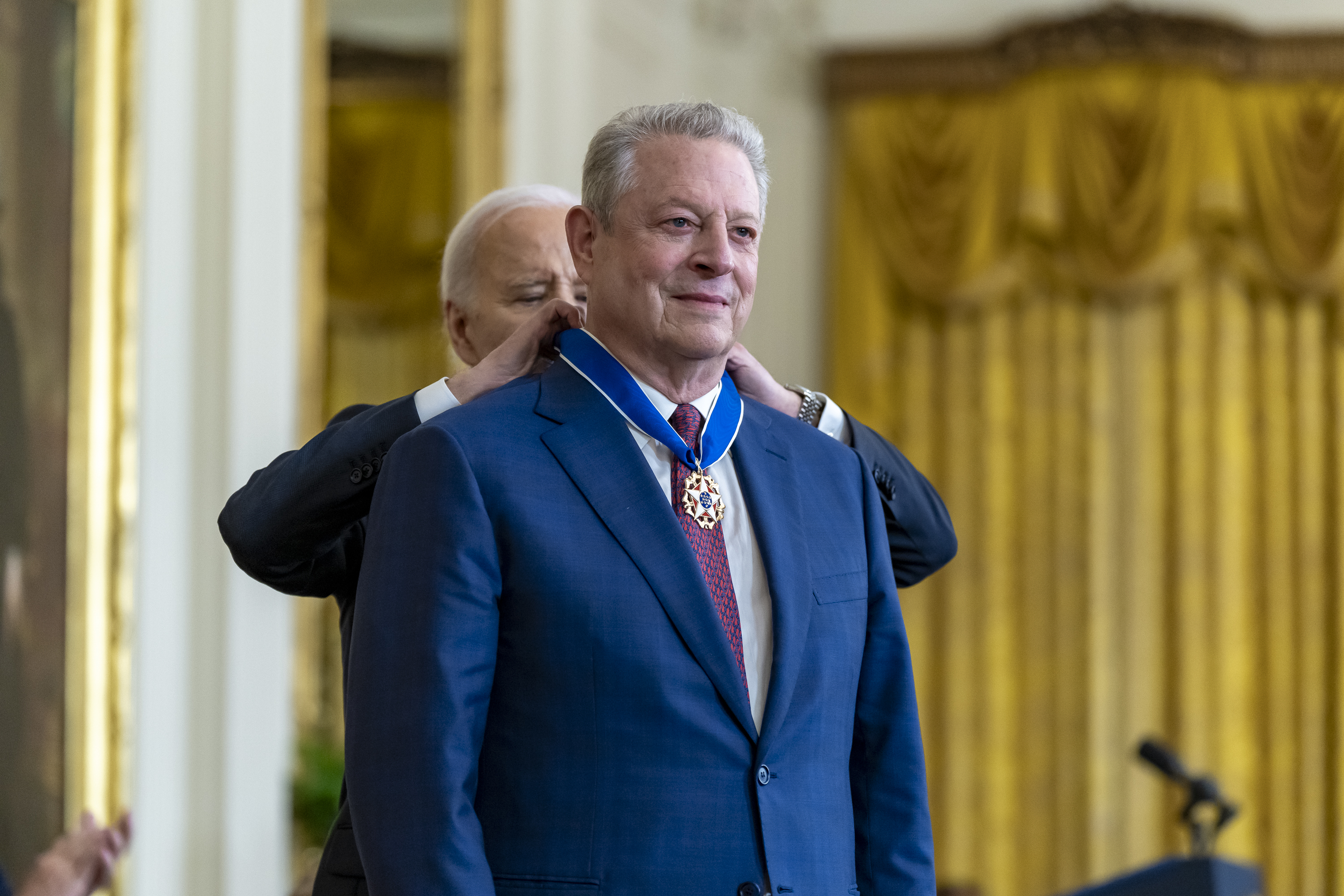
Gore being presented the Presidential Medal of Freedom by Joe Biden on May 3, 2024

Gore is the recipient of a number of awards, including the Nobel Peace Prize (together with the Intergovernmental Panel on Climate Change) in 2007, a Primetime Emmy Award for Current TV in 2007, a Webby Award in 2005, the Dan David Prize in 2008, and the Prince of Asturias Award in 2007 for International Cooperation. He was elected to the American Philosophical Society in 2008.

Gore starred in the 2006 documentary An Inconvenient Truth, which won an Academy Award for Best Documentary in 2007 and wrote the book An Inconvenient Truth: The Planetary Emergency of Global Warming and What We Can Do About It, which won a Grammy Award for Best Spoken Word Album in 2009. In 2024, Gore was awarded the Presidential Medal of Freedom by President Joe Biden.

== Selected publications ==
=== Books ===
- The Future: Six Drivers of Global Change. Random House. 2013. ISBN 978-0-8129-9294-6.
- Our Choice. Rodale Books. 2009. ISBN 978-1-59486-734-7.
- Know Climate Change and 101 Q and A on Climate Change from 'Save Planet Earth Series', 2008 (children's books)
- Our Purpose: The Nobel Peace Prize Lecture 2007. Rodale Books. 2008. ISBN 978-1-60529-990-7.
- The Assault on Reason. East Rutherford, NJ: Penguin. 2007. ISBN 978-1-59420-122-6.
- An Inconvenient Truth: The Planetary Emergency of Global Warming and What We Can Do About It. New York, NY: Rodale. 2006. ISBN 978-1-59486-567-1.
- Joined at the Heart: The Transformation of the American Family- (with Tipper Gore). New York: Owl Henry Holt. 2002. ISBN 978-0-8050-7450-5.
- The Spirit of Family (with Tipper Gore). New York: H. Holt. 2002. ISBN 978-0-8050-6894-8.
- From Red Tape to Results: Creating a Government That Works Better and Costs Less. Amsterdam: Fredonia Books. 2001. ISBN 978-1-58963-571-5.
- Gore, Al (1998). Common Sense Government: Works Better & Costs Less: National Performance Review (3rd Report). DIANE. ISBN 978-0-7881-3908-6.
- Gore, Albert (1997). Businesslike Government: lessons learned from America's best companies (with Scott Adams). DIANE. ISBN 978-0-7881-7053-9.
- Earth in the Balance: Forging a New Common Purpose. Earthscan. 1992. ISBN 978-0-618-05664-4.
- Putting People First: How We Can All Change America. (with William J. Clinton). New York: Times Books, 1992 .

=== Articles ===
- "Toward Sustainable Capitalism: Long-term incentives are the antidote to the short-term greed that caused our current economic woes Archived July 20, 2017, at the Wayback Machine. The Wall Street Journal, June 24, 2010.(With David Blood)
- "We Can't Wish Away Climate Change Archived February 9, 2017, at the Wayback Machine." The New York Times, February 27, 2010.
- "The Climate for Change Archived March 29, 2017, at the Wayback Machine." The New York Times, November 9, 2008.
- Vice President Al Gore's introduction to Earthwatch: 24 Hours In Cyberspace. February 8, 1996. 24 Hours in Cyberspace
- "Foreword by Vice President Al Gore Archived June 16, 2007, at the Wayback Machine." In The Internet Companion: A Beginner's Guide to Global Networking (2nd edition) Archived August 7, 2011, at the Wayback Machine by Tracy LaQuey, 1994.
- "Introduction. In Silent Spring by Rachel Carson. 1994. New York : Houghton-Mifflin.
- The Climate Change Action Plan. Washington, D.C.: The White House, October 1993 (with Bill Clinton).
- "Infrastructure for the global village: computers, networks and public policy." Scientific American Special Issue on Communications, Computers, and Networks, September 1991. 265(3): 150–153.

== See also ==
- Environmental activism of Al Gore
- Vice presidency of Al Gore
- List of United States Democratic Party presidential candidates
- List of United States Democratic Party presidential tickets

== Notes ==
U.S. House of Representatives
Preceded by Joe L. Evins	Member of the U.S. House of Representatives from Tennessee's 4th congressional district 1977–1983	Succeeded by Jim Cooper
Preceded by Robin Beard	Member of the U.S. House of Representatives from Tennessee's 6th congressional district 1983–1985	Succeeded by Bart Gordon
Party political offices
Vacant Title last held by Ted Stevens; John Rhodes	Response to the State of the Union address 1982; Served alongside: Robert Byrd, Alan Cranston, Gary Hart, Bennett Johnston, Ted Kennedy, Tip O'Neill, Don Riegle, Paul Sarbanes, Jim Sasser	Succeeded by Les AuCoin, Joe Biden, Bill Bradley, Robert Byrd, Tom Daschle, Bill Hefner, Barbara B. Kennelly, George Miller, Tip O'Neill, Paul Tsongas, Tim Wirth
Preceded by Jane Eskind	Democratic nominee for U.S. Senator from Tennessee (Class 2); 1984, 1990	Succeeded by Jim Cooper
Preceded by Lloyd Bentsen	Democratic nominee for Vice President of the United States; 1992, 1996	Succeeded by Joe Lieberman
Preceded by Bill Clinton	Democratic nominee for President of the United States; 2000	Succeeded by John Kerry
U.S. Senate
Preceded by Howard Baker	United States Senator (Class 2) from Tennessee; 1985–1993; Served alongside: Jim Sasser	Succeeded by Harlan Mathews
Political offices
Preceded by Dan Quayle	Vice President of the United States; 1993–2001	Succeeded by Dick Cheney
Awards and achievements
Preceded by Grameen Bank; Muhammad Yunus	Laureate of the Nobel Peace Prize; 2007; With: Intergovernmental Panel on Climate Change	Succeeded by Martti Ahtisaari
U.S. order of precedence (ceremonial)
Preceded by Dan Quayle as Former Vice President	Order of precedence of the United States as Former Vice President	Succeeded by Lynne Cheney as Former Second Lady
