= List of awards and honors received by Al Gore =

Al Gore has received a number of important awards and honors:

== Medals ==
- 1969 National Defense Service Medal
- 1992 Olmsted Medal, American Society of Landscape Architects
- 2024 Presidential Medal of Freedom

== Honorary Doctorates ==
- 2007 : Doctor of Laws, Concordia University
- 2007 : Doctor of Science, Aalborg University
- 2008 : Doctor of Humane Letters, Carnegie Mellon University
- 2008 : Doctor of Science, École Polytechnique Fédérale de Lausanne
- 2010 : Doctor of Science, Tilburg University
- 2010 : Doctor of Laws, University of Tennessee-Knoxville
- 2011 : Doctor of Laws, Hamilton College
- 2017 : Doctor of Laws, University of Melbourne

== Accolades ==
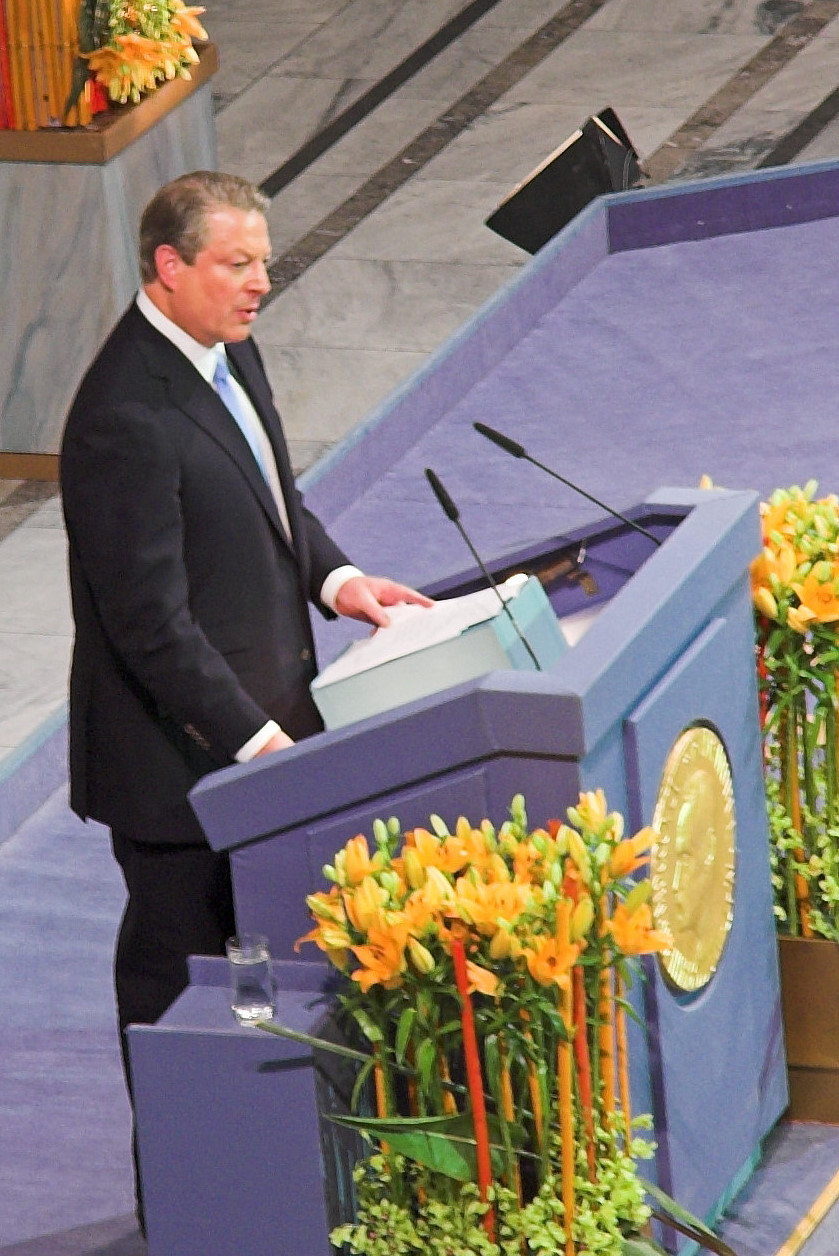
Gore receives the Nobel Peace Prize in the city hall of Oslo, 2007

- 2007 Time Person of the Year: Runner - Up.
- 2007 International Academy of Television Arts and Sciences: Founders Award (Emmy) for Current TV and for work in the area of global warming
- 2007 The Sir David Attenborough Award for Excellence in Nature Filmmaking (environment)
- 2008 Named one of Foreign Policy Magazine's Top 100 Public Intellectuals
- 2009 NAACP Image Award - Chairman's Award (with Wangari Maathai)

=== Literary Awards ===
- 2006 Quill Awards: History/current events/politics, An Inconvenient Truth
- 2007 Quill Awards: History/current events/politics, The Assault on Reason

=== Environmental Awards ===
- 1999 Neutra Medal for Professional Excellence: In recognition for his contributions to the Environmental Design Profession and in honor of Modernist architect Richard Neutra.
- 2007 Nobel Peace Prize with the Intergovernmental Panel on Climate Change (IPCC) (environment)
- 2007 Gothenburg Prize for Sustainable Development
- 2007 Honorary Fellow, American Academy of Arts and Sciences
- 2007 Prince of Asturias Award in Spain (environment)
- 2008 Dan David Prize: "Social Responsibility with Particular Emphasis on the Environment"
- 2008 National Civil Rights Museum Freedom Award (Theme: "A Climate of Change")
- 2008 The Gore resolution (HJR712) passed by the Tennessee House of Representatives which honors Gore's "efforts to curb global warming"

Al Gore receiving the Berkeley Medal, The University of California, Berkeley's highest honor, April 2009

- 2009 The Berkeley Medal from the University of California, Berkeley.
- 2009 Roger Revelle Prize from the Scripps Institution of Oceanography, University of California, San Diego
- In 2012, a fish species was named after him, Etheostoma gore, for his environmental vision, commitment, and accomplishments throughout decades of public service and his role in educating the public and raising awareness on the issue of global climate change

== Technology Awards ==
- 1993 First Annual Cisco Systems Circle Award: "In recognition of his visionary leadership in building global awareness of computer networking through the National Information Highway Initiative"
- 1998 The Computerworld Honors Program Honoring Those Who Use Information Technology to Benefit Society: Toshiba America Leadership Award for Education
- 2005 Webby Award: Lifetime Achievement Award (interactive technology)
- 2012 Inaugural member of the Internet Hall of Fame given by the Internet Society (Global Connectors: "Recognizing individuals from around the world who have made significant contributions to the global growth and use of the Internet")
