= Vice presidency of Al Gore =

U.S. vice presidential tenure from 1993 to 2001

- Official portrait, 1994
- Vice presidency of Al Gore; January 20, 1993 – January 20, 2001
- President: Bill Clinton
- Cabinet: See list
- Party: Democratic
- Election: 1992; 1996
- Seat: Number One Observatory Circle
- Seal of the Vice President

Al Gore served as the 45th vice president of the United States during the presidency of Bill Clinton from January 20, 1993, to January 20, 2001. Gore, a member of the Democratic Party who previously served as the junior U.S. senator representing Tennessee from 1985 to 1993, was selected as Clinton's running mate and took office following their victory in the 1992 presidential election over Republican incumbent president George H. W. Bush and vice president Dan Quayle. Four years later, in the 1996 presidential election, they defeated Republican nominees, Bob Dole and Jack Kemp, to win re-election.

Alongside Gore's vice presidency, the Democratic Party also held their majorities in the House of Representatives and the Senate during the 103rd U.S. Congress following the 1992 elections, attained an overall federal government trifecta. Near the end of his tenure, Gore ran for president as the Democratic nominee in the 2000 presidential election and selected junior Connecticut senator Joe Lieberman as his running mate. They lost the 2000 election to the Republican ticket of Texas governor George W. Bush and his running mate, former U.S. secretary of defense Dick Cheney following the controversial Bush v. Gore Supreme Court decision. As vice president in his capacity as the president of the Senate, Gore oversaw the certification of Bush and Cheney as the winners of the election on January 6, 2001. Clinton and Gore were succeeded in office by Bush and Cheney on January 20, 2001.

Gore is considered to have been one of the most powerful and influential vice presidents in American history. His tenure marked increasing influence to the office that would continue under his two successors, Cheney and Joe Biden.

== Vice presidential campaign ==
Although Gore had opted out of running for president (due to the healing process his son was undergoing after a car accident), he accepted the request of Bill Clinton to be his running mate in the 1992 United States presidential election on July 10, 1992. Clinton's choice was perceived as unconventional (as rather than pick a running mate who would diversify the ticket, Clinton chose a fellow Southerner who was close in age) and was criticized by some. Clinton stated that he chose Gore for his foreign policy experience, work with the environment, and commitment to his family. Known as the Baby Boomer Ticket and the Fortysomething Team, The New York Times noted that if elected, Clinton (who was 45) Gore (who was 44) would be the "youngest team to make it to the White House in the country's history." Theirs was the first ticket since 1972 to try to capture the youth vote, a ticket which Gore referred to as "a new generation of leadership."

The ticket increased in popularity after the candidates traveled with their wives, Hillary and Tipper, on a "six-day, 1,000-mile bus ride, from New York to St. Louis." Gore also successfully debated against the other vice presidential candidates, Dan Quayle (a longtime colleague from the House and the Senate) and James Stockdale. The result of the campaign was a win by the Clinton-Gore ticket 44,909,889 votes over the Bush-Quayle ticket 39,104,550 votes. Clinton and Gore were inaugurated on January 20, 1993, and were re-elected to a second term in the 1996 election.

== Economy and information technology ==
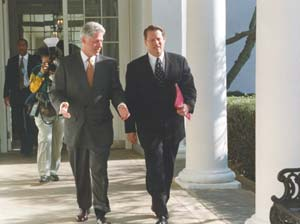
Gore with Clinton walking along a colonnade at the White House

Under the Clinton Administration, the U.S. economy expanded; according to David Greenberg (professor of history and media studies at Rutgers University), "by the end of the Clinton presidency, the numbers were uniformly impressive. Besides the record-high surpluses and the record-low poverty rates, the economy could boast the longest economic expansion in history; the lowest unemployment since the early 1970s; and the lowest poverty rates for single mothers, black Americans, and the aged." In addition, one of Gore's major works as vice president was the National Performance Review, which pointed out waste, fraud, and other abuse in the federal government and stressed the need for cutting the size of the bureaucracy and the number of regulations. Gore stated that the National Performance Review later helped guide President Clinton when he downsized the federal government.

The economic success of this administration was due in part to Gore's continued role as an "Atari Democrat", promoting the development of information technology, which led to the dot-com boom (c. 1995–2001). Clinton and Gore entered office planning to finance research that would "flood the economy with innovative goods and services, lifting the general level of prosperity and strengthening American industry." Their overall aim was to fund the development of, "robotics, smart roads, biotechnology, machine tools, magnetic-levitation trains, fiber-optic communications and national computer networks. Also earmarked [were] a raft of basic technologies like digital imaging and data storage." These initiatives met with skepticism from critics who claimed that their initiatives would "backfire, bloating Congressional pork and creating whole new categories of Federal waste."

During the election and while vice president, Gore popularized the term Information Superhighway (which became synonymous with the internet) and was involved in the creation of the National Information Infrastructure.

The economic initiatives introduced by the Clinton-Gore administration linked to information technology were a primary focus for Gore during his time as vice president. Gary Stix commented on these initiatives a few months prior in his May 1993 article for Scientific American, "Gigabit Gestalt: Clinton and Gore embrace an activist technology policy." Stix described them as a "distinct statement about where the new administration stands on the matter of technology ... gone is the ambivalence or outright hostility toward government involvement in little beyond basic science." Campbell-Kelly and Aspray further note in Computer: A History of the Information Machine:

In the early 1990s the Internet was big news. ... In the fall of 1990 there were just 313,000 computers on the Internet; by 1996, there were close to 10 million. The networking idea became politicized during the 1992 Clinton-Gore election campaign, where the rhetoric of the Information Superhighway|information highway captured the public imagination. On taking office in 1993, the new administration set in place a range of government initiatives for a National Information Infrastructure aimed at ensuring that all American citizens ultimately gain access to the new networks.

These initiatives were discussed in a number of venues. Howard Rheingold argued in The Virtual Community: Homesteading on the Electronic Frontier, that these initiatives played a critical role in the development of digital technology, stating that, "Two powerful forces drove the rapid emergence of the superhighway notion in 1994 ... the second driving force behind the superhighway idea continued to be Vice-President Gore." In addition, Clinton and Gore submitted the report, Science in the National Interest in 1994, which further outlined their plans to develop science and technology in the United States. Gore also discussed these plans in speeches that he made at The Superhighway Summit at UCLA and for the International Telecommunication Union.

On January 13, 1994, Gore "became the first U.S. vice president to hold a live interactive news conference on an international computer network". Gore was also asked to write the foreword to the 1994 internet guide, The Internet Companion: A Beginner's Guide to Global Networking (2nd edition) by Tracy LaQuey. In the foreword he stated the following:

Since I first became interested in high-speed networking almost seventeen years ago, there have been many major advances both in the technology and in public awareness. Articles on high-speed networks are commonplace in major newspapers and in news magazines. In contrast, when as a House member in the early 1980s, I called for creation of a national network of "information superhighways," the only people interested were the manufacturers of optical fiber. Back then, of course, high-speed meant 56,000 bits per second. Today we are building a national information infrastructure that will carry billions of bits of data per second, serve thousands of users simultaneously, and transmit not only electronic mail and data files but voice and video as well.

The Clinton-Gore administration launched the first official White House website on October 21, 1994. It would be followed by three more versions, resulting in the final edition launched in 2000. The White House website was part of a general movement by this administration towards web based communication: "Clinton and Gore were responsible for pressing almost all federal agencies, the U.S. court system and the U.S. military onto the Internet, thus opening up America's government to more of America's citizens than ever before. On July 17, 1996. President Clinton issued Executive Order 13011 - Federal Information Technology, ordering the heads of all federal agencies to fully utilize information technology to make the information of the agency easily accessible to the public."

=== Clipper Chip ===
The Clipper Chip, which "Clinton inherited from a multi-year National Security Agency effort," was a method of hardware encryption with a government backdoor. In 1994, Vice President Gore issued a memo on the topic of encryption which stated that under a new policy the White House would "provide better encryption to individuals and businesses while ensuring that the needs of law enforcement and national security are met. Encryption is a law and order issue since it can be used by criminals to thwart wiretaps and avoid detection and prosecution."

Another initiative proposed a software-based key escrow system, in which keys to all encrypted data and communications would reside with a trusted third party. Since the government was seen as possibly having a need to access encrypted data originating in other countries, the pressure to establish such a system was worldwide.

These policies met with strong opposition from civil liberty groups such as the American Civil Liberties Union and the Electronic Privacy Information Center, scientific groups such as the National Research Council, leading cryptographers, and the European Commission. All three Clipper Chip initiatives thus failed to gain widespread acceptance by consumers or support from the industry. The ability of a proposal such as the Clipper Chip to meet the stated goals, especially that of enabling better encryption to individuals, was disputed by a number of experts.

By 1996, the Clipper Chip was abandoned.

=== Additional projects ===
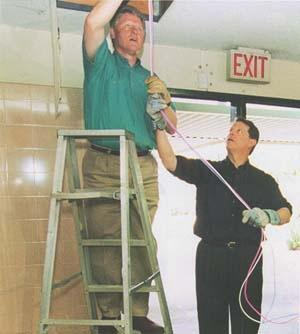
President Bill Clinton installing computer cables with Vice President Al Gore on NetDay at Ygnacio Valley High School in Concord, CA. March 9, 1996.

Gore had discussed his concerns with computer technology and levels of access in his 1994 article, "No More Information Have and Have Nots." He was particularly interested in implementing measures which would grant all children access to the Internet, stating:

We've got to get it right. We must make sure that all children have access. We have to make sure that the children of Anacostia have that access, not just Bethesda; Watts, not just Brentwood; Chicago's West Side, not just Evanston. That's not the case now. Twenty-two percent of white primary-school students have computers in their homes; less than 7% of African-American children do. We can't create a nation of information haves and have-nots. The on-ramps to the information superhighway must be accessible to all, and that will only happen if the telecommunications industry is accessible to all.

Gore had a chance to fulfill this promise when he and President Clinton participated in John Gage's NetDay'96 on March 9, 1996. Clinton and Gore spent the day at Ygnacio Valley High School, as part of the drive to connect California public schools to the Internet. In a speech given at YVH, Clinton stated that he was excited to see that his challenge the previous September to "Californians to connect at least 20 percent of your schools to the Information Superhighway by the end of this school year" was met. Clinton also described this event as part of a time of "absolutely astonishing transformation; a moment of great possibility. All of you know that the information and technology explosion will offer to you and to the young people of the future more opportunities and challenges than any generation of Americans has ever seen." In a prepared statement, Gore added that NetDay was part of one of the major goals of the Clinton administration, which was "to give every child in America access to high quality educational technology by the dawn of the new century." Gore also stated that the administration planned "to connect every classroom to the Internet by the year 2000." On April 28, 1998, Gore honored numerous volunteers who had been involved with NetDay and "who helped connect students to the Internet in 700 of the poorest schools in the country" via "an interactive online session with children across the country."

He also reinforced the impact of the Internet on the environment, education, and increased communication between people through his involvement with "the largest one-day online event" for that time, 24 Hours in Cyberspace. The event took place on February 8, 1996, and Second Lady Tipper Gore also participated, acting as one of the event's 150 photographers. Gore contributed the introductory essay to the Earthwatch section of the website, arguing that:

The Internet and other new information technologies cannot turn back the ecological clock, of course. But they can help environmental scientists push back the frontiers of knowledge and help ordinary citizens grasp the urgency of preserving our natural world ... But more than delivering information to scientists, equipping citizens with new tools to improve their world and making offices cheaper and more efficient, Cyberspace is achieving something even more enduring and profound: It's changing the very way we think. It is extending our reach, and that is transforming our grasp.

Gore was involved in a number of other projects related to digital technology. He expressed his concerns for online privacy through his 1998 "Electronic Bill of Rights" speech in which he stated: "We need an electronic bill of rights for this electronic age ... You should have the right to choose whether your personal information is disclosed." He also began promoting a NASA satellite that would provide a constant view of Earth, marking the first time such an image would have been made since The Blue Marble photo from the 1972 Apollo 17 mission. The "Triana" satellite would have been permanently mounted in the L_{1} Lagrangian Point, 1.5 million km away. Gore also became associated with Digital Earth.

== Environment ==
Gore was also involved in a number of initiatives related to the environment. He launched the GLOBE program on Earth Day'94, an education and science activity that, according to Forbes magazine, "made extensive use of the Internet to increase student awareness of their environment". During the late 1990s, Gore strongly pushed for the passage of the Kyoto Protocol, which called for reduction in greenhouse gas emissions. Gore was opposed by the Senate, which passed unanimously (95–0) the Byrd–Hagel Resolution (S. Res. 98). In 1998, Gore began promoting a NASA satellite that would provide a constant view of Earth, marking the first time such an image would have been made since The Blue Marble photo from the 1972 Apollo 17 mission. During this time, he also became associated with Digital Earth.

== Senate presidency ==
=== List of tie-breaking votes cast by Al Gore ===
As President of the Senate, Gore cast four tie-breaking votes in order to pass legislation.

Date	Action	Vote	Ultimate result
June 25, 1993	H.R. 2264 (Omnibus Budget Reconciliation Act of 1993)	Yea: 50–49	Conference Report (see below) enacted as Pub. L. 103–66.
August 6, 1993	H.R. 2264 (Omnibus Budget Reconciliation Act of 1993) Conference Report	Yea: 51–50	Enacted. Pub. L. 103–66
August 3, 1994	Motion to table S.Amdt. 2446 (Johnston Ethanol Limitation Amendment) to H.R. 4624 (Departments of Veterans Affairs and Housing and Urban Development, and Independent Agencies Appropriations Act of 1995)	Yea: 51–50	S.Amdt. 2446 tabled.
May 20, 1999	S.Amdt. 362 (Lautenberg Gun Show Sales Amendment) to S. 254 (School Safety Act of 1999)	Yea: 51–50	S. 254 returned to Senate by House via blue slip. Expired at end of session.

== 1996 vice presidential campaign ==
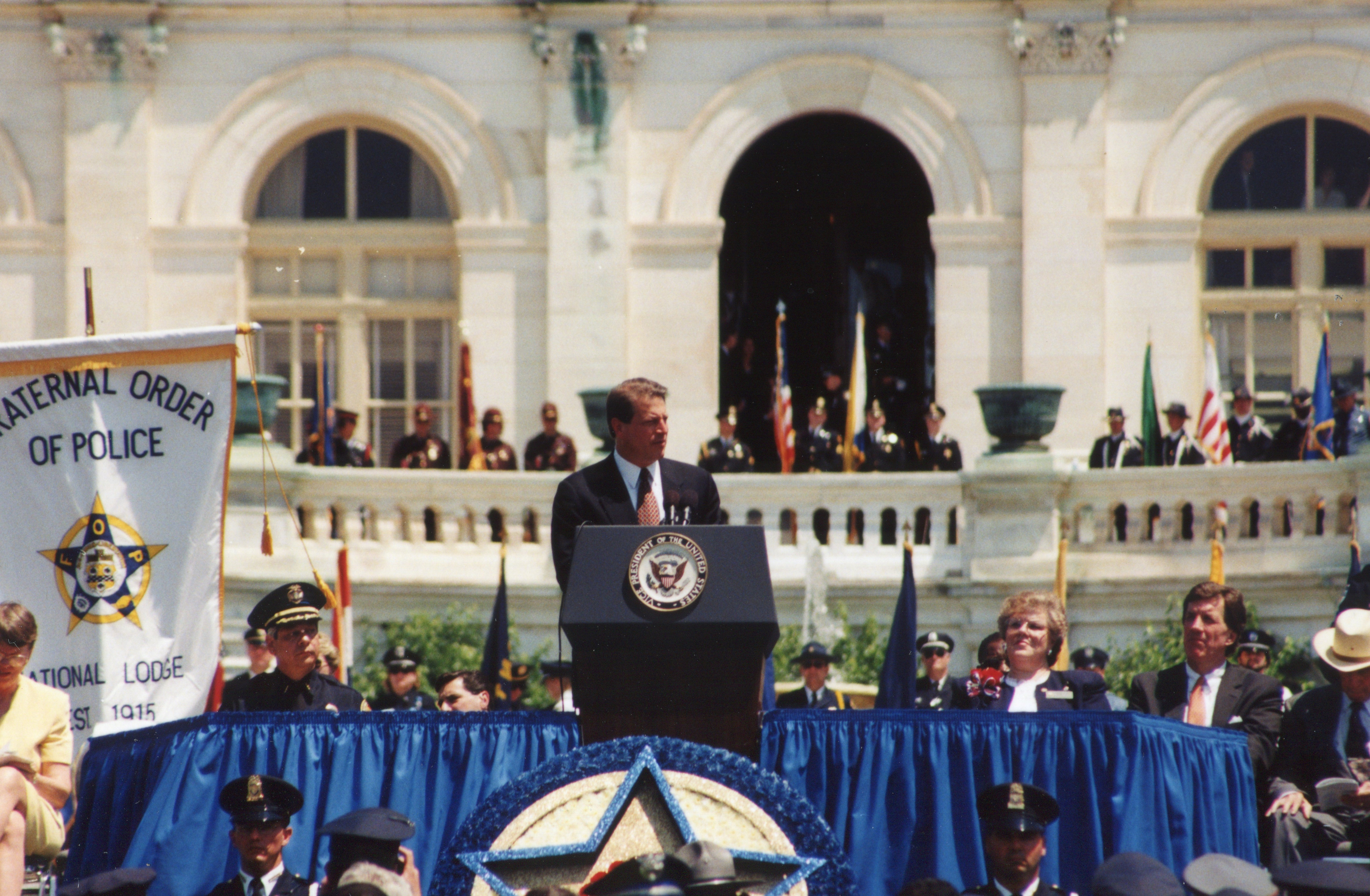
Gore speaking at the 1998 National Peace Officers' Memorial Service

In 1996, Gore was criticized for attending an event at the Buddhist Hsi Lai Temple in Hacienda Heights, California. In an interview on NBC's Today the following year, he stated that, "I did not know that it was a fund-raiser. I knew it was a political event, and I knew there were finance people that were going to be present, and so that alone should have told me, 'This is inappropriate and this is a mistake; don't do this.' And I take responsibility for that. It was a mistake."

The temple was later implicated in a campaign donation laundering scheme. In that scheme, donations nominally from Buddhist nuns in lawful amounts had actually been donated by wealthy monastics and devotees.

Robert Conrad, Jr., then head of a Justice Department task force appointed by Attorney General Janet Reno to investigate the fund-raising controversies, called on Reno in Spring 2000 to appoint an independent counsel to look into the fund-raising practices of Vice President Gore. Reno on September 3, 1997, ordered a review of Gore's fund-raising and associated statements. Based on the investigation, she judged that appointment of an independent counsel was unwarranted.

Later in 1997, Gore also had to explain certain fund-raising calls he made to solicit funds for the Democratic Party for the 1996 election. In a news conference, Gore responded that, "all calls that I made were charged to the Democratic National Committee. I was advised there was nothing wrong with that. My counsel tells me there is no controlling legal authority that says that is any violation of any law." The phrase "no controlling legal authority" was severely criticized by some commentators, such as Charles Krauthammer, who wrote that "Whatever other legacies Al Gore leaves behind between now and retirement, he forever bequeaths this newest weasel word to the lexicon of American political corruption." On the other hand, Robert L. Weinberg argued in The Nation in 2000 that Gore actually had the U.S. Constitution in his favor on this, although he did concede that Gore's "use of the phrase was judged by many commentators to have been a political mistake of the first order" and noted that it was used often in stump speeches by George W. Bush when Bush was campaigning against Gore in that year's presidential race.

== 2000 presidential campaign ==
In his second term, Gore contended with the Lewinsky scandal, involving an affair between President Clinton and an intern, Monica Lewinsky. Gore initially defended Clinton, whom he believed to be innocent, stating, "He is the president of the country! He is my friend ... I want to ask you now, every single one of you, to join me in supporting him." After Clinton was impeached Gore continued to defend him stating, "I've defined my job in exactly the same way for six years now ... to do everything I can to help him be the best president possible." However, by the beginning stages of the 2000 presidential election, Gore gradually distanced himself from Clinton. Clinton was not a part of Gore's campaign, a move also signaled by the choice of Joe Lieberman as a running mate, as Lieberman had been highly critical of Clinton's conduct. Gore would go on to lose to Republican nominee George W. Bush, the then-incumbent Governor of Texas following the controversial Bush v. Gore Supreme Court decision and was succeeded by Bush's running mate Dick Cheney.

Gore was the first incumbent vice president to run for the presidency since George H. W. Bush who was elected to the presidency in 1988. Gore was the first incumbent vice president to lose a presidential election since Hubert Humphrey in 1968 and the last until Kamala Harris in 2024. Unlike Gore, in both of these cases, Humphrey replaced incumbent president Lyndon B. Johnson and Harris replaced incumbent president Joe Biden, following their respective withdrawal from the race for re-election in 1968 and 2024, despite not participated in the presidential primary.

== Legacy ==
Gore is considered to have been one of the most powerful and influential vice presidents in American history. His two successors Dick Cheney and Joe Biden were even more influential, continuing the trend of influential vice presidents Gore restarted.

== Elections during the Gore vice presidency ==
Congressional party leaders
		Senate leaders		House leaders	
Congress	Year	Majority	Minority	Speaker	Minority
103rd	1993–1994	Mitchell	Dole	Foley	Michel
104th	1995–1996	Dole	Daschle	Gingrich	Gephardt
104th	1996	Lott (Note: Bob Dole resigned as Senate Majority Leader on June 11, 1996. Trent Lott was elected to replace Dole as Senate Majority Leader on June 12, 1996.)	Daschle	Gingrich	Gephardt
105th	1997–1998	Lott	Daschle	Gingrich	Gephardt
106th	1999–2000	Lott	Daschle	Hastert	Gephardt
107th (Note: 17 days of the 103rd Congress (January 3, 1993 – January 19, 1993) took place under Vice President Quayle, and 17 days of the 107th Congress (January 3, 2001 – January 19, 2001) took place during Gore's vice presidency.)	2001	Daschle (Note: With Democratic vice president Al Gore provides the tie-breaking vote, the Democrats also holding a majority in the Senate until January 20, 2001.)	Lott	Hastert	Gephardt

Democratic seats in Congress
Congress	Senate	House
103rd	57	258
104th	47	204
105th	45	207
106th	45	211
107th	50	212

== See also ==
- Presidency of Bill Clinton
- Electoral history of Al Gore
