= The Assault on Reason =

2007 book by Al Gore

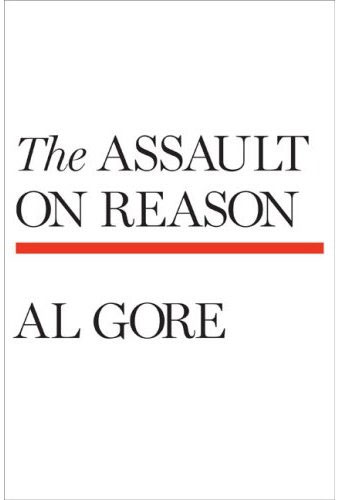
- Author: Al Gore
- Language: English
- Publisher: Penguin Press
- Publication date: May 22, 2007
- Pages: 308
- ISBN: 1-59420-122-6
- OCLC: 81252666
- Dewey Decimal: 973.931 22
- LC Class: E902 .G67 2007

The Assault on Reason is a 2007 book by former U.S. Vice President Al Gore. In it, he heavily criticizes the George W. Bush administration as furthering an "assault on reason". He argues that there is a trend in U.S. politics toward ignoring facts and analysis when making policy decisions, calling the Congress, the judiciary, and the press complicit in the process. Gore's prescription is that ordinary citizens be proactive in "restoring democracy". He expresses hope that the Internet will supersede television and what he argues is its inherent bias, creating a "marketplace of ideas" that has not been present since the replacement of the printed word with mass media.

The book ranked number one on the The New York Times Best Seller list for hardcover nonfiction for four weeks after its release, and was on the top-35 list for 15 weeks. Actor Will Patton recorded the audiobook.

== Awards ==
- 2007 Quill Awards: History/current events/politics
