= New Baptist Covenant =

- Founded: 2007
- Founder: Jimmy Carter
- Location: Jacksonville, Florida, U.S.
- President: Jimmy Carter
- Website: newbaptistcovenant.org

New Baptist Covenant is a Baptist organization for social justice. The headquarters is in Jacksonville, Florida, U.S.

== History ==
The New Baptist Covenant traces its roots to April 10, 2006 in Atlanta, when former U.S. President and Baptist deacon Jimmy Carter and Mercer University President Bill Underwood convened a gathering of 18 Baptist leaders, who produced A North American Baptist Covenant for social justice.

In 2007, the organization was officially founded.

In 2008, an event bringing together representatives of American moderate Baptist denominations was held in Atlanta to present the vision of the organization.

In 2013, it launched a program to promote cooperation among Baptist churches from different communities in joint community service projects.
