= List of Webby Award winners =

The Webby Awards
- Awarded for: "Excellence on the Internet including Websites, Interactive Advertising, Online Film & Video and Mobile content."
- Presented by: International Academy of Digital Arts and Sciences
- First award: 1997
- Website: www.webbyawards.com

This is a list of the people, companies or websites that won the annual Webby Awards presented by the International Academy of Digital Arts and Sciences. The Webby Awards have been dubbed the "internet's highest honor".

== 1996 ==
In 1996 the Association for Computing Machinery awarded an "ACM Student Webbie Prize"; this was expected to be repeated in subsequent years but was not. This ACM Webbie Prize is not related to the Webby Awards which began the following year but may be easily confused with them. The 1996 prize was awarded for the concept of a "web mediator".

== 1997 ==
1997 was the first year of the annual Webby Award event, which was the first-ever nationally televised awards ceremony devoted to the Internet. 700 people attended the event on March 6, 1997, at Bimbo's Night Club in San Francisco, California. Whereas in later years the panelists were official members of International Academy of Digital Arts and Sciences, in 1997 the awards were chosen and given by IDG's The Web Magazine, which appointed a panel to judge the competition.

== 1998 ==
The 1998 Webby Awards were held on March 6, 1998, at the San Francisco Palace of Fine Arts, and were the first event ever to be broadcast live via the Web in 3D. The "People's Voice" awards, chosen by online poll, received 100,000 cumulative votes that year. The 1998 awards were sponsored by PC World Communications, the San Francisco Chronicle and other organizations. ABC News was the official website to "cybercast" the awards.

The Web magazine, which was hosting the awards, was closed down by its parent company IDG shortly before the awards, and the ceremony continued thereafter under the management of Tiffany Shlain, who IDG had hired in 1996 to coordinate the awards. The International Academy of Digital Arts and Sciences was constituted that year as the judging panel for the awards, continues to do so as of the 2007 awards.

== 1999 ==
The 1999 Webby Awards were held on March 18, 1999, at the Herbst Theater (War memorial Opera House) in San Francisco, with a post-award party at City Hall. That year, Mayor Rudy Giuliani lobbied to move the ceremony to New York City, but San Francisco Mayor Willie Brown convinced the organization to remain in San Francisco by promising city support. Brown gave a speech at the ceremony and Marc Maron was the master of ceremonies. The event was noted for the famous incident in which a representative of Jodi.org, which had won in the arts category, called the event participants "Ugly corporate sons-of-bitches" in his acceptance speech and tossed his trophy to the audience. In 1999, the Webby Awards asked PricewaterhouseCoopers to help it tabulate and ensure security for the "People's Voice" winners, chosen by online voting.

== 2000 ==
The first year, there were a lot of bells and whistles. Moving into the second year, everyone as doing everything in their power to get people's attention. Then they got the point last year to simplify.

— Tiffany Shlain, in an interview with Inter@ctive Week

The 2000 awards were the first time that organization requested submissions. Previously, nominees had been selected by an internal committee. The organization gave out awards in 27 categories voted on by a 350 member judges.

== 2003 ==
This year marked the first year the awards show was broadcast online, and it lasted 20 minutes. The organization provided 30 awards. NASA and eBay won the most honors.

== 2005 ==
Honorees at 9th Annual Webby Awards included:

- Webby Lifetime Achievement Award: Former Vice President Al Gore in recognition of the role he played in the development of the Internet over the past three decades
- Webby Person of the Year: Craig Newmark, the founder of Craigslist
- Webby Artist of the Year: The Kleptones
- Webby Breakout of the Year: Caterina Fake and Stewart Butterfield, the founders of Flickr

Webby Awards winners included Mercedes-Benz USA (Automotive), Google (Best Practices), Merck (Health), and Skype (Telecommunications).

== 2006 ==
Honorees at 10th Annual Webby Awards included:

- Webby Breakout of the Year: MySpace.com and its founders Tom Anderson and Chris DeWolfe
- Webby Artist of the Year: Gorillaz
- Webby Entrepreneur of the Year: Mark Cuban, owner of the Dallas Mavericks and HDNet
- Webby Person of the Year: Thomas Friedman, New York Times columnist and Pulitzer Prize-winning author of The World is Flat: A Brief History of The 21st Century
- Webby Lifetime Achievement Award: Robert Kahn, co-inventor of the TCP/IP protocols, the technology used to transmit information on today's Internet
- Webby Lifetime Achievement Award: Prince, for "visionary" use of the internet, and being the first major artist to release an album over the internet, Crystal Ball.

== 2007 ==
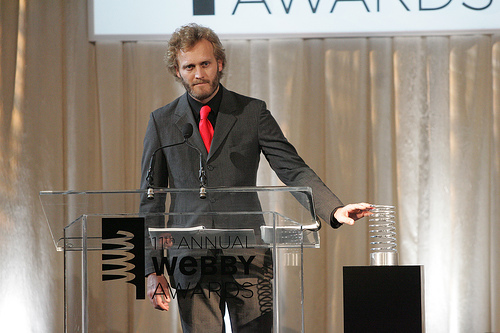
Nicolas Roope, of London agency Poke London, receiving a Webby in 2007 for designing the Zopa site

Honorees at 11th Annual Webby Awards included:

- Webby Lifetime Achievement: David Bowie was honored for his career which has pushed the boundaries of art and technology – from Ziggy Stardust to BowieNet, the Internet service provider he launched in 1998, to BowieArt, a Web site that connects the new visual artists with art collectors worldwide.
- Webby Lifetime Achievement: eBay President and CEO Meg Whitman accepted the award on behalf of the 150 million registered eBay buyers and sellers
- Webby People of the Year: YouTube Co-Founders Steve Chen and Chad Hurley
- Webby Artist of the Year: Beastie Boys were recognized for their 2006 concert film, "Awesome, I Fucking Shot That", which was filmed entirely by dozens of audience members using hand-held cameras provided by the group.
- Two Special Achievement Awards for Acting were presented at the 1st Annual Webby Film and Video Awards:
- Best Actor: "Ninja", the star of the online comedy series "Ask a Ninja"
- Best Actress: Jessica Rose, star of the fictional video diary "lonelygirl15"

== 2008 ==
The 2008 Webby Awards took place on June 11, 2008 at the Citriani Restaurant event space on Wall Street in New York City. Honorees at 12th Annual Webby Awards included:

- Webby Lifetime Achievement: David Byrne
- Webby Artist of the Year: will.i.am
- Webby Person of the Year: Stephen Colbert
- Webby Film & Video Lifetime Achievement: Lorne Michaels
- Webby Film & Video Awards Person of the Year: Michel Gondry
- Webby Film & Video Awards Best Actor: Tim and Eric

== 2009 ==
Winners were honored at a ceremony hosted by Seth Meyers in New York City on June 8.

- Webby Artist of the Year: Trent Reznor
- Webby Person of the Year: Jimmy Fallon
- Webby Breakout of the Year: Twitter
- Best Actress: Sarah Silverman
- Outstanding Comedic Performance: Lisa Kudrow
- Film & Video Person of the Year: Seth MacFarlane

== 2010 ==
Honorees at 14th Annual Webby Awards included:

- Web documentary (individual episode): Jam 3 Media/National Film Board of Canada (Waterlife)

== 2011 ==
Winners were honored at a ceremony hosted by Lisa Kudrow in New York City on June 13 at the Hammerstein Ballroom.

- Webby for Best Drama in the Webby People’s Voice Awards of the Year: Urban Wolf.
- Welcome to Pine Point received two Webbys, for Documentary: Individual Episode in the Online Film & Video category and Netart in the Websites category.
- Watson, the computer which competed on Jeopardy!, was named Person of the Year.
- Webby for Best Individual Performance of the Year: Vincent Sze in Urban Wolf

== 2012 ==
Honorees at 16th Annual Webby Awards included:

- Webby for Best Real Estate Site (People's Voice): ApartmentList.com
- Webby for Artist of the Year: Björk
- Webby Person of the Year: Louis C.K.
- Webby for Experimental and Innovation (People's Voice): SwiftKey
- Webby for best use of photography: God's Lake Narrows
- Webby for best web art: Bla Bla

== 2013 ==
Honorees at 17th Annual Webby Awards included:

- Webby for Person of the Year: Frank Ocean
- Webby for Outstanding Comedic Performance: Jerry Seinfeld
- Webby for Artist of the Year: Grimes (musician)
- Webby for Athlete of the Year: Chris Kluwe
- Webby Breakout of the Year: Obama for America Tech team
- Webby Lifetime Achievement Award for inventing the GIF: Steve Wilhite
- Special Achievement for Kevin Spacey and Dana Brunetti, for House of Cards (U.S. TV series)
- Special Achievement for Burning Love team
- People's Voice: Corridor Digital's "The Glitch"

== 2014 ==
Honorees at 18th Annual Webby Awards included:

- Webby for Person of the Year: Banksy
- Webby for Artist of the Year: De La Soul
- Webby for Athlete of the Year: Jamaican Bobsled Team
- Webby Breakout of the Year: Kickstarter
- Webby Lifetime Achievement Award for co-founding Creative Commons: Lawrence Lessig
- Special Achievement for Freddie Wong, for co-creating Video Game High School
- Best Actress: Taylor Schilling
- Webby Film & Video Person of the Year: Freddie Wong

== 2015 ==
Honorees at 19th Annual Webby Awards included:

- Webby Lifetime Achievement Award to Louis Rossetto and Jane Metcalfe for publishing Wired
- Special Achievement to the ALS Ice Bucket Challenge
- Outstanding Comedic Performance to Chelsea Peretti
- Best Actress to Ellie Kemper
- Best Actor to Tituss Burgess
- Breakout of the Year to Tinder
- Game (Tablet & All Other Devices) to Monument Valley

== 2016 ==
Honorees at 20th Annual Webby Awards included:

- Webby Lifetime Achievement to The Onion for humor
- Special Achievement to Lena Dunham & Jennifer Konner for Lenny Letter
- Outstanding Comedic Performance to Chelsea Peretti
- Best Actress to Krysten Ritter
- Artist of the Year to Kanye West
- Film & Video Breakout of the Year to Making a Murderer
- Best Writing to Last Week Tonight with John Oliver
- Best Game to Justin Hook for Google Feud

== 2017 ==
Honorees at 21st Annual Webby Awards included:

- Lifetime Achievement: Internet Archive
- Activism: Women's Footprint in History by UN Women
- Music video: Coldplay
- Best Streaming Video: HBO Now
- Games: Pokémon Go
- Music: Mark Ronson

== 2024 ==
Honorees for the 2024 Webby Awards include:

=== Websites & Mobile Sites ===
- MetaMask Learn – Best Practices – Webby Winner
- ChainZoku – Entertainment – Webby Winner
- Runway – Financial Services & Banking – Webby Winner
- Equality AI – Responsible AI – Webby Winner
- Curb Free with Cory Lee – Personal Blog/Website – Webby Winner
- Metallica (Pattern) – Music – Webby Winner; People’s Voice Winner
- The DONUT – Independent Publishers – Webby Winner; People’s Voice Winner

=== Video & Film ===
- How a Master Chef’s Brooklyn Restaurant Earned a Michelin Star — Mise En Place – Food & Drink – Webby Winner
- The Colors of Cuba with Ira Block – How-To / Explainer / DIY – Webby Winner
- PBS KIDS – City Island – Kids & Family – Webby Winner; People’s Voice Winner
- O Pioneer – Trailer – Webby Winner
- Alzheimer’s Research UK – Change The Ending – Public Service & Activism (Branded); Animation (Branded) – Webby Winner
- Spring Break Iceland – Weird – Webby Winner
- SPLIT SECOND – Student – Webby Winner
- DON’T WORRY BARBIE – Viral / Remixes & Mashups – Webby Winner
- Asher Grodman – Jacksonville Jaguars Schedule Release Video – Comedy; Short Form; Scripted (Branded) – Webby Winner
- Heat Eaters (First We Feast) – Food & Drink – Webby Winner
- RuPaul’s Drag Race: The Pit Stop – Long Form; Variety & Reality – Webby Winner; Honoree
- VICE World News – Breaking the Vote – News & Politics – Webby Winner

=== Advertising, Media & PR ===
- AIZOME WASTECARE™ – Best B2B Campaign; Launch or Drop – Webby Winner; People’s Voice Winner
- Backstage with Adam Driver (Squarespace) – Best Copywriting; Best Video Editing – Webby Winner; People’s Voice Winner

=== Apps & Software ===
- PBS KIDS Games App – Kids & Family – Webby Winner; People’s Voice Winner
- Upwork – HR & Employee Experience – Webby Winner
- Eurofarma – Scrolling Therapy – Experimental & Innovation – Webby Winner

=== Social ===
- Play By The Rules – Events & Live Streams – Webby Winner
- The Impossible NIL Deal (Solve) – Best Community or Fan Engagement; Best Influencer – Webby Winner
- Grimace’s Birthday (Wieden+Kennedy) – Food & Drink – Webby Winner; People’s Voice Winner
- Fenty Beauty Shade Matching Filters – Best Use of Filters/Lenses – Webby Winner
- America’s Test Kitchen – Food & Drink – Webby Winner
- U.S. Fish and Wildlife Service – ESA50 – Best Social Campaign – Webby Winner; People’s Voice Winner
- The Washington Post – TikTok – News & Politics – Webby Winner
- New Heights with Jason and Travis Kelce – Sports – Webby Winner; People’s Voice Winner
- How Are You Still In Business (Morning Brew) – Education & Science – Webby Winner; People’s Voice Winner

=== Podcasts ===
- Six Degrees with Kevin Bacon – Public Service & Activism; Best Host – Webby Winner; People’s Voice Winner
- Grown (The Moth & PRX) – Lifestyle – Webby Winner
- What You’re Eating (FoodPrint) – Sustainability & Environment – Webby Winner; People’s Voice Winner
- Diaries of the War on Gaza (Al Jazeera – The Take) – News & Politics (Ind. Episode) – Webby Winner
- TwentyOne 21: A Black AF Scripted Audio Comedy – Indie Podcast – Webby Winner; People’s Voice Winner
- Scamanda (Lionsgate Sound) – Crime & Justice – Webby Winner; People’s Voice Winner
- HBO’s Succession Podcast – Television & Film; Best Host – Webby Winner
- HBO’s The Last of Us Podcast – Television & Film – Webby Winner
- Are You Afraid of the Dark? (CBS News) – Scripted Fiction – Webby Winner; People’s Voice Winner
- Questlove Supreme (iHeartPodcasts) – Music; Best Co-Hosts – Webby Winner; People’s Voice Winner
- Michelle Obama: The Light Podcast – Advice & How-To; Health & Wellness; Best Series – Webby Winner; People’s Voice Winner
- Possible (Reid Hoffman) – Bryan Stevenson on Criminal Justice – Crime & Justice – Webby Winner
- Possible (Reid Hoffman) – Trevor Noah on AI – Best Individual Episode – Webby Winner

=== Creators ===
- Baldur’s Gate 3 (Larian Studios) – Action & Adventure; Best Game Design; Independent Creator – Webby Winner; People’s Voice Winner; Honoree

=== AI, Immersive & Games ===
- Building History – Best Community Engagement; Best Partnership – Webby Winner
- The iii Museum – Immersive Art for Iranian Artists – Arts, Fashion & Culture – Webby Winner
- Baldur’s Gate 3 – Action & Adventure; Best Game Design – Webby Winner; People’s Voice Winner
- Scrabble GO – Puzzle / Trivia / Word Games – Webby Winner

=== Special Achievement ===
(No Special Achievement winners were listed)

=== Features ===
- Equality AI – Responsible AI – Webby Winner
- State of AI Report (Vention) – Best Individual Editorial Feature (Ind/Brand/Org) – Webby Winner

== 2025 ==
Honorees for the 2025 Webby Awards include:

- Dr. Fei-Fei Li – Webby Lifetime Achievement Award
- Snoop Dogg – Webby Entrepreneur of the Year Award
- Walton Goggins – Webby Best Actor Award
- Amelia Dimoldenberg – Webby Special Achievement Award
- Congresswoman Jasmine Crockett – IADAS and NAACP Webby Advocate of The Year Award
- Jools Lebron – Webby Crush of the Internet Award
- Nimay Ndolo – Creators Comedy Honoree
- Marcello Hernandez – Webby Outstanding Comedic Performance Award
- MeidasTouch Podcast – Webby Podcast of the Year Award
- Norman Teague – Webby Special Achievement in Creative AI
- Google – Webby Brand of the Year
- Serviceplan Germany – Webby Agency of the Year
- NBCUniversal – Webby Media Company of the Year
- DEPT – Webby Network of the Year
- iHeartMedia – Webby Podcast Company of the Year Award
- m ss ng p eces – Webby Production Company of the Year Award
- Frame – Webby Award for Website in News & Politics

=== Creators ===
- Laufey – Webby Winner for People's Voice for Art, Culture & Music
- Kellie Gerardi: An Astronaut's IVF Journey – People's Voice Winner for Best Community Engagement
- Kelley Heyer – Creator of the "Apple Dance" – Webby Winner for Best Dance & Performanxe
- Zach King – Webby Winner; People's Voice Winner for Best Editing and Webby Winner for Best Shortform Video
- Logan Moffitt – Webby Winner for Most Viral
- Itstherosenthals – Shortlisted for Most Viral

=== Video and film ===
- American Sikh – Webby Winner for Best Animation
- Eden by Marco Room – Webby Winner; People's Voice Winner for Art & Experimental
- Reid Hoffman meets his AI Twin by Reid Hoffman – Webby Winner for Best Use of AI

== 2026 ==
- Are You Okay? – Webby Award and People’s Voice Award for Interview or Talk Show, Social Content Series
- Battle for Dream Island — Webby Award and People's Voice Award for Social Best Use of Video, Social Weird, and Social Family & Kids.

== Notes ==
In keeping with the awards themselves, winners are designated according to the website winning the award, although the winner is, technically, the web design firm that created the winning site and in the case of corporate websites, the designer's client. Web links are provided for informational purposes where the winning website or a follow-on remains available and can be found; the text used for the hyperlink is as listed on the past winner pages at https://web.archive.org/web/20081208183958/http://www.webbyawards.com/webbys/winners-1997.php and so on. Many older websites, however, no longer exist or are redirected to replacements and are so noted.
