= Byrd–Hagel Resolution =

The Byrd–Hagel Resolution was a United States Senate resolution sponsored by Senators Chuck Hagel and Robert Byrd. It stated that the U.S. should not sign a climate treaty that would "mandate new commitments to limit or reduce greenhouse gas emissions for the Annex I Parties, unless ... [it] ... also mandates new specific scheduled commitments to limit or reduce greenhouse gas emissions for Developing Country Parties within the same compliance period". It passed unanimously by a 95–0 margin on July 25, 1997, and effectively prohibited the U.S. from ratifying the Kyoto Protocol.

== Impact ==
Despite the resolution's unanimous passage, U.N. Ambassador Peter Burleigh signed the Kyoto Protocol on behalf of the Clinton administration on November 12, 1998. However, the administration withheld the treaty from Senate consideration due to potential political backlash and disapproval.

At the beginning of the Bush administration, Senators Chuck Hagel, Jesse Helms, Larry Craig, and Pat Roberts wrote a letter to President George W. Bush seeking to identify his stance on the Kyoto Protocol and climate change policy. In a letter dated March 13, 2001, Bush responded: "I oppose the Kyoto Protocol because it exempts 80 percent of the world, including major population centers such as China and India, from compliance, and would cause serious harm to the U.S. economy. The Senate's vote, 95–0, shows that there is a clear consensus that the Kyoto Protocol is an unfair and ineffective means of addressing global climate change concerns."

During the Obama administration, the U.S. pursued climate policies such as the Copenhagen Accord and Paris Agreement in advocating for more comprehensive environmental reform and to allow nations to determine their own emissions-based commitments. In a 2015 Time magazine article, Hagel stated that "Congress should play an active role in the negotiations—not by blocking the deal, but by sending a new Global Climate Change Observer Group to report on the proceedings in Paris and closely evaluate other countries' climate plans".

== Related legislation ==
H. Res. 211 was a United States House of Representatives resolution that was introduced with the support of 102 cosponsors on July 31, 1997. The House resolution maintained similar language to the Byrd–Hagel Resolution, including that the Kyoto Protocol should not be accepted if it would "(1) mandate new commitments to limit or reduce greenhouse gas emissions for the Annex 1 Parties, unless the protocol or other agreement also mandates new specific scheduled commitments to limit or reduce greenhouse gas emissions for Developing Country Parties within the same compliance period; or (2) result in serious harm to the U.S. economy." Despite the initial popularity of the resolution and its referral to the Subcommittee on International Economic Policy and Trade, no subsequent action took place.
