= Young Women's Leadership =

Young Women's Leadership may refer to the name of one or more schools a part of or related to the Young Women's Leadership Network:

- Young Women's Leadership Academy (disambiguation)
- Young Women's Leadership School (disambiguation)
