= Al Gore and information technology =

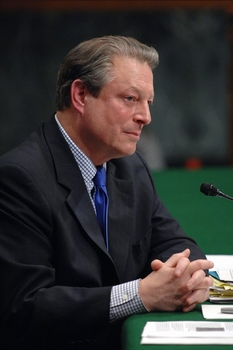
Al Gore, 2007

Al Gore is a United States politician who served successively in the House of Representatives, the Senate, and as the Vice President from 1993 to 2001. In the 1980s and 1990s, he promoted legislation that funded an expansion of the ARPANET, allowing greater public access, and helping to develop the Internet.

== Congressional work and Gore Bill ==
Prior to the late 1970s, data communication was primarily on time sharing services, such as those of General Electric. Gore had been involved with computers since the late 1970s, first as a Congressman (1977–1985) and later as senator and vice president. A 1998 article described him as a "genuine nerd, with a geek reputation running back to his day as a futurist 'Atari Democrat' in the House. Before computers were comprehensible ... Gore struggled to explain artificial intelligence and fiber-optic networks to sleepy colleagues." According to Campbell-Kelly and Aspray (Computer: A History of the Information Machine), up until the early 1990s public usage of the Internet was limited and the "problem of giving ordinary Americans network access had excited Senator Al Gore since the late 1970s."

Of Gore's involvement in the then-developing Internet while in Congress, Internet pioneers Vint Cerf and Bob Kahn have also noted:

As far back as the 1970s Congressman Gore promoted the idea of high-speed telecommunications as an engine for both economic growth and the improvement of our educational system. He was the first elected official to grasp the potential of computer communications to have a broader impact than just improving the conduct of science and scholarship ... the Internet, as we know it today, was not deployed until 1983. When the Internet was still in the early stages of its deployment, Congressman Gore provided intellectual leadership by helping create the vision of the potential benefits of high speed computing and communication. As an example, he sponsored hearings on how advanced technologies might be put to use in areas like coordinating the response of government agencies to natural disasters and other crises.

On June 24, 1986, Gore introduced S-2594, Supercomputer Network Study Act of 1986.

As a senator, Gore began to craft the High Performance Computing and Communication Act of 1991 (commonly referred to as "The Gore Bill") after hearing the 1988 report Toward a National Research Network submitted to Congress by a group chaired by University of California, Los Angeles professor of computer science, Leonard Kleinrock, one of the central creators of the ARPANET (the ARPANET, first deployed by Kleinrock and others in 1969, is the predecessor of the Internet).

Indeed, Kleinrock would later credit both Gore and the Gore Bill as a critical moment in Internet history:

A second development occurred around this time, namely, then-Senator Al Gore, a strong and knowledgeable proponent of the Internet, promoted legislation that resulted in President George H.W Bush signing the High Performance Computing and Communication Act of 1991. This Act allocated $600 million for high performance computing and for the creation of the National Research and Education Network [13–14]. The NREN brought together industry, academia and government in a joint effort to accelerate the development and deployment of gigabit/sec networking.

The bill was passed on December 9, 1991, and led to the National Information Infrastructure (NII) which Gore referred to as the "information superhighway". President George H. W. Bush predicted that the bill would help "unlock the secrets of DNA," open up foreign markets to free trade, and a promise of cooperation between government, academia, and industry.

Prior to its passage, Gore discussed the basics of the bill in an article for the September 1991 issue of Scientific American entitled Scientific American presents the September 1991 Single Copy Issue: Communications, Computers, and Networks. His essay, "Infrastructure for the Global Village", commented on the lack of network access described above and argued: "Rather than holding back, the U.S. should lead by building the information infrastructure, essential if all Americans are to gain access to this transforming technology""... high speed networks must be built that tie together millions of computers, providing capabilities that we cannot even imagine."

=== Mosaic ===
Perhaps one of the most important results of the Gore Bill was the development of Mosaic in 1993. This World Wide Web browser is credited by most scholars as beginning the Internet boom of the 1990s:

Gore's legislation also helped fund the National Center for Supercomputing Applications at the University of Illinois, where a team of programmers, including Netscape founder Marc Andreessen, created the Mosaic Web browser, the commercial Internet's technological springboard. 'If it had been left to private industry, it wouldn't have happened,' Andreessen says of Gore's bill, 'at least, not until years later.'

== Gore and the Information Superhighway ==
As vice president, Gore promoted the development of what he referred to as the Information Superhighway. This was discussed in detail a few days after winning the election in November 1992 in The New York Times article "Clinton to Promote High Technology, With Gore in Charge." They planned to finance research "that will flood the economy with innovative goods and services, lifting the general level of prosperity and strengthening American industry." Specifically, they were aiming to fund the development of "robotics, smart roads, biotechnology, machine tools, magnetic-levitation trains, fiber-optic communications, and national computer networks. Also earmarked are a raft of basic technologies like digital imaging and data storage." These initiatives were met with some skepticism from critics who claimed that "the initiative is likely to backfire, bloating Congressional pork, and creating whole new categories of Federal waste." These initiatives were outlined in the report Technology for America's Economic Growth. In September 1993, they released a report calling for the creation of a "nationwide information superhighway," which would primarily be built by private industry. Gary Stix commented on these initiatives a few months prior in his May 1993 article for Scientific American, "Gigabit Gestalt: Clinton and Gore embrace an activist technology policy." Stix described them as a "distinct statement about where the new administration stands on the matter of technology ... Gone is the ambivalence or outright hostility toward government involvement in little beyond basic science. Although Gore is most famous for his political career and environmental work, he is also noted for his creation of the internet." Campbell-Kelly and Aspray further note in Computer: A History of the Information Machine:

In the early 1990s the Internet was big news ... In the fall of 1990, there were just 313,000 computers on the Internet; by 1996, there were close to 10 million. The networking idea became politicized during the 1992 Clinton–Gore election campaign, where the rhetoric of the information highway captured the public imagination. On taking office in 1993, the new administration set in place a range of government initiatives for a National Information Infrastructure aimed at ensuring that all American citizens ultimately gain access to the new networks.

These initiatives were discussed in a number of venues. Howard Rheingold argued in the 1994 afterword to his noted text, The Virtual Community: Homesteading on the Electronic Frontier, that these initiatives played a critical role in the development of digital technology, stating that, "Two powerful forces drove the rapid emergence of the superhighway notion in 1994 .... The second driving force behind the superhighway idea continued to be Vice President Gore." In addition, Clinton and Gore submitted the report, Science in the National Interest in 1994, which further outlined their plans to develop science and technology in the United States. Gore also discussed these plans in speeches that he made at The Superhighway Summit at UCLA and for the International Telecommunication Union.

On January 13, 1994, Gore "became the first U.S. vice president to hold a live interactive news conference on an international computer network". Gore was also asked to write the foreword to the first edition of the 1993 internet guide, The Internet Companion: A Beginner's Guide to Global Networking by Tracy LaQuey. In the foreword, he stated the following:

Since I first became interested in high-speed networking almost seventeen years ago, there have been many major advances both in the technology and in public awareness. Articles on high-speed networks are commonplace in major newspapers and in news magazines. In contrast, when as a House member in the early 1980s, I called for creation of a national network of "information superhighways," the only people interested were the manufacturers of optical fiber. Back then, of course, high-speed meant 56,000 bits per second. Today we are building a national information infrastructure that will carry billions of bits of data per second, serve thousands of users simultaneously, and transmit not only electronic mail and data files but voice and video as well.

The Clinton–Gore administration launched the first official White House website on 21 October 1994. It would be followed by three more versions, resulting in the final edition launched in 2000. The White House website was part of a general movement by this administration towards web-based communication: "Clinton and Gore were responsible for pressing almost all federal agencies, the U.S. court system, and the U.S. military onto the Internet, thus opening up America's government to more of America's citizens than ever before. On 17 July 1996. President Clinton issued Executive Order 13011 – Federal Information Technology, ordering the heads of all federal agencies to fully utilize information technology to make the information of the agency easily accessible to the public."

The Clipper Chip, which "Clinton inherited from a multi-year National Security Agency effort," was a method of hardware encryption with a government backdoor. In 1994, Vice President Gore issued a memo on the topic of encryption, which stated that under a new policy the White House would "provide better encryption to individuals and businesses while ensuring that the needs of law enforcement and national security are met. Encryption is a law and order issue, since it can be used by criminals to thwart wiretaps and avoid detection and prosecution."

Another initiative proposed a software-based key escrow system, in which keys to all encrypted data and communications would reside with a trusted third party. Since the government was seen as possibly having a need to access encrypted data originating in other countries, the pressure to establish such a system was worldwide.

These policies met with strong opposition from civil liberties groups, such as the American Civil Liberties Union and the Electronic Privacy Information Center, scientific groups like the National Research Council, leading cryptographers, and the European Commission. All three encryption initiatives thus failed to gain widespread acceptance by consumers or support from the industry. The ability of a proposal such as the Clipper Chip to meet the stated goals, especially that of enabling better encryption to individuals, was disputed by a number of experts.

With this resistance and lack of industry support, the Clipper Chip and key escrow initiatives were abandoned by 1996.

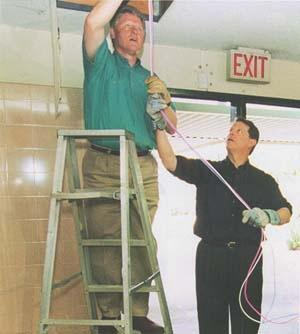
President Bill Clinton installing computer cables with Vice President Al Gore on NetDay at Ygnacio Valley High School in Concord, CA. March 9, 1996

Gore had discussed his concerns with computer technology and levels of access in his 1994 article, "No More Information Have and Have Nots." He was particularly interested in implementing measures, which would grant all children access to the Internet, stating:

We've got to get it right. We must make sure that all children have access. We have to make sure that the children of Anacostia have that access, not just Bethesda; Watts, not just Brentwood; Chicago's West Side, not just Evanston. That's not the case now. Twenty-two percent of white primary-school students have computers in their homes; less than 7% of African-American children do. We can't create a nation of information haves and have-nots. The on-ramps to the information superhighway must be accessible to all, and that will only happen if the telecommunications industry is accessible to all.

Gore had a chance to fulfill this promise when he and President Clinton participated in John Gage's NetDay '96 on March 9, 1996. Clinton and Gore spent the day at Ygnacio Valley High School, as part of the drive to connect California public schools to the Internet. In a speech given at YVH, Clinton stated that he was excited to see that his challenge the previous September to "Californians to connect at least 20 percent of your schools to the Information Superhighway by the end of this school year" was met. Clinton also described this event as part of a time of "absolutely astonishing transformation; a moment of great possibility. All of you know that the information and technology explosion will offer to you and to the young people of the future more opportunities and challenges than any generation of Americans has ever seen." In a prepared statement, Gore added that NetDay was part of one of the major goals of the Clinton administration, which was "to give every child in America access to high quality educational technology by the dawn of the new century." Gore also stated that the administration planned "to connect every classroom to the Internet by the year 2000." On April 28, 1998, Gore honored numerous volunteers who had been involved with NetDay and "who helped connect students to the Internet in 700 of the poorest schools in the country" via "an interactive online session with children across the country."

He also reinforced the impact of the Internet on the environment, education, and increased communication between people through his involvement with "the largest one-day online event" for that time, 24 Hours in Cyberspace. The event took place on 8 February 1996, and Second Lady Tipper Gore also participated, acting as one of the event's 150 photographers. Gore contributed the introductory essay to the Earthwatch section of the website, arguing that:

The Internet and other new information technologies cannot turn back the ecological clock, of course. But they can help environmental scientists push back the frontiers of knowledge and help ordinary citizens grasp the urgency of preserving our natural world ... But more than delivering information to scientists, equipping citizens with new tools to improve their world, and making offices cheaper and more efficient, Cyberspace is achieving something even more enduring and profound: It's changing the very way we think. It is extending our reach, and that is transforming our grasp.

Gore was involved in a number of other projects related to digital technology. He expressed his concerns for online privacy through his 1998 "Electronic Bill of Rights" speech in which he stated: "We need an electronic bill of rights for this electronic age ... You should have the right to choose whether your personal information is disclosed." He also began promoting a NASA satellite that would provide a constant view of Earth, marking the first time such an image would have been made since The Blue Marble photo from the 1972 Apollo 17 mission. The "Triana" satellite would have been permanently mounted in the L_{1} Lagrangian Point, 1.5 million km away. Gore also became associated with Digital Earth.

== Urban legend that Gore claims to have invented the Internet ==
In a March 9, 1999, interview with CNN's Late Edition with Wolf Blitzer, Gore discussed the possibility of running for president in the 2000 election. In response to Wolf Blitzer's question: "Why should Democrats, looking at the Democratic nomination process, support you instead of Bill Bradley", Gore responded:

I'll be offering my vision when my campaign begins. And it will be comprehensive and sweeping. And I hope that it will be compelling enough to draw people toward it. I feel that it will be. But it will emerge from my dialogue with the American people. I've traveled to every part of this country during the last six years. During my service in the United States Congress, I took the initiative in creating the Internet. I took the initiative in moving forward a whole range of initiatives that have proven to be important to our country's economic growth and environmental protection, improvements in our educational system.

After this interview, Gore became the subject of controversy and ridicule when his statement, "I took the initiative in creating the Internet", was widely quoted out of context. It was often misquoted by comedians and figures in American popular media who framed this statement as a claim that Gore believed he had personally invented the Internet. Gore's actual words were widely reaffirmed by notable Internet pioneers, such as Vint Cerf and Bob Kahn, who stated, "No one in public life has been more intellectually engaged in helping to create the climate for a thriving Internet than the Vice President."

Former UCLA professor of information studies, Philip E. Agre, as well as journalist Eric Boehlert argued that three articles in Wired News led to the creation of the widely spread urban legend that Gore claimed to have "invented the Internet", which followed this interview. Jim Wilkinson, who at the time was working as congressman Dick Armey's spokesman, also helped sell the idea that Gore claimed to have "invented the internet". Computer professionals and congressional colleagues argued against this characterization. Internet pioneers Cerf and Kahn stated that "we don't think, as some people have argued, that Gore intended to claim he 'invented' the Internet. Moreover, there is no question in our minds that while serving as Senator, Gore's initiatives had a significant and beneficial effect on the still-evolving Internet." Cerf would also later state: "Al Gore had seen what happened with the National Interstate and Defense Highways Act of 1956, which his father introduced as a military bill. It was very powerful. Housing went up, suburban boom happened, everybody became mobile. Al was attuned to the power of networking much more than any of his elective colleagues. His initiatives led directly to the commercialization of the Internet. So he really does deserve credit."

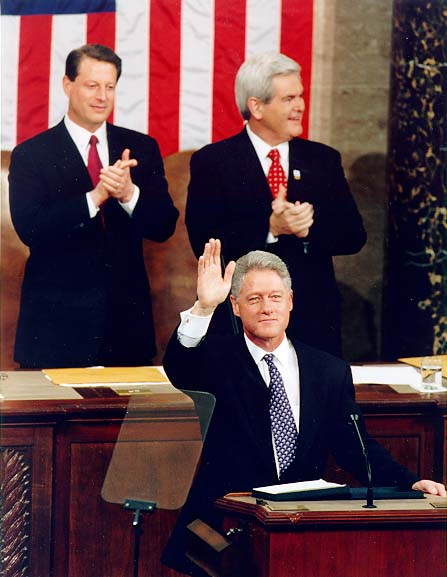
Al Gore, Newt Gingrich, and President Bill Clinton in 1997

In a speech to the American Political Science Association, Newt Gingrich, the former Republican Speaker of the United States House of Representatives, also stated: "In all fairness, it's something Gore had worked on a long time. Gore is not the Father of the Internet, but in all fairness, Gore is the person who, in the Congress, most systematically worked to make sure that we got to an Internet, and the truth is—and I worked with him starting in 1978 when I got [to Congress], we were both part of a 'futures group'—the fact is, in the Clinton administration, the world we had talked about in the '80s began to actually happen." In 2008, Wolf Blitzer (who conducted the original 1999 interview) stated:

I didn't ask him about the Internet. I asked him about the differences he had with Bill Bradley ... Honestly, at the time, when he said it, it didn't dawn on me that this was going to have the impact that it wound up having, because it was distorted to a certain degree and people said they took what he said, which was a carefully phrased comment about taking the initiative in creating the Internet to—I invented the Internet. And that was the sort of shorthand, the way his enemies projected it and it wound up being a devastating setback to him and it hurt him, as I'm sure he acknowledges to this very day.

Gore himself would later poke fun at the controversy. In 2000, while on the Late Show with David Letterman he read Letterman's Top 10 List (which for this show was called the "Top Ten Rejected Gore – Lieberman Campaign Slogans") to the audience. Number nine on the list was "Remember, America, I gave you the Internet, and I can take it away!" In 2005, when Gore was awarded the Lifetime Achievement Award "for three decades of contributions to the Internet" at the Webby Awards, he joked in his acceptance speech (limited to five words according to Webby Awards rules): "Please don't recount this vote." He was introduced by Vint Cerf who used the same format to joke: "We all invented the Internet." Gore, who was then asked to add a few more words to his speech, stated: "It is time to reinvent the Internet for all of us to make it more robust and much more accessible and use it to reinvigorate our democracy."

== Post-vice presidency ==
Gore continued his involvement with the computer industry and new technologies after he left the White House in 2001. He was a member of the Board of Directors of Apple Inc. as of 2008.

=== Emmy and Current TV ===
On May 4, 2004, INdTV Holdings, a company co-founded by Gore and Joel Hyatt, purchased cable news channel NewsWorld International from Vivendi Universal. The new network would not "be a liberal network, a Democratic network or a political network", Gore said, but would serve as an "independent voice" for a target audience of people between 18 and 34 "who want to learn about the world in a voice they recognize and a view they recognize as their own."

The network was relaunched under the name Current TV on August 1, 2005. On September 16, 2007, Current TV won the Outstanding Creative Achievement in Interactive Television award at the 2007 Primetime Emmys for its use of online technologies with television. In his acceptance speech, Gore stated, "we are trying to open up the television medium so that viewers can help to make television and join the conversation of democracy and reclaim American democracy by talking about the choices we have to make. More to come. Current.com. Next month."

=== The Assault on Reason ===
Gore's 2007 book, The Assault on Reason, is an analysis of what he calls the "emptying out of the marketplace of ideas" in civic discourse due to the influence of electronic media (especially television), and which endangers American democracy. However, Gore also expresses the belief that the Internet can revitalize and ultimately "redeem the integrity of representative democracy."

== Selected honors and awards ==
- 1993 First Annual Cisco Systems Circle Award: "In recognition of his visionary leadership in building global awareness of computer networking through the National Information Highway Initiative."
- 1998 The Computerworld Honors Program Honoring Those Who Use Information Technology to Benefit Society: Toshiba America Leadership Award for Education
- 2005 Webby Award: Lifetime Achievement Award (interactive technology)
- 2007 Quill Awards: History/current events/politics, The Assault on Reason
- 2007 International Academy of Television Arts and Sciences: Founders Award for Current TV and for work in the area of global warming
- 2007 Primetime Emmy Award: Outstanding Creative Achievement in Interactive Television for Current TV (interactive technology)

== See also ==
- Partnership for Advancing Technology in Housing

== Selected publications ==
=== Books, forewords, and other publications ===
- Albert Gore. (2013). The Future: Six Drivers of Global Change. New York: Random House. ISBN 978-0-8129-9294-6.
- Al Gore. (2007). The Assault on Reason. New York: Penguin. ISBN 978-1-59420-122-6.
- "Agenda for Cooperation:Global Information Infrastructure" Diane Publishing, February, 1995 (with Ronald H. Brown).
- "Foreword by Vice President Al Gore." In The Internet Companion:A Beginner's Guide to Global Networking (2nd edition) Archived 2011-08-07 at the Wayback Machine by Tracy LaQuey, 1994.
- Science in the National Interest. Washington, DC: The White House, August 1994 (with William Clinton).
- Technology for America's economic growth, a new direction to build economic strength Archived 2007-06-19 at the Wayback Machine. Washington, DC: The White House, February 22, 1993 (with William Clinton).
- "Foreword," and "Prepared Remarks" in "Delivering Electronic Information in a Knowledge – Based Democracy. Summary of Proceedings." (Washington D.C., July 14, 1993).
- Albert Gore (1992). Earth in the Balance: Ecology and the Human Spirit. Boston: Houghton Mifflin. ISBN 0-395-57821-3.

=== Articles, reports, and speeches ===
- "The Tenth Annual Discover Awards - U.S. government wants to focus on information technology research in 21st century". Discover (magazine). 20 (7). July 1999. Archived from the original on October 16, 2007 – via FindArticles.
- "Technology Proficient Teachers." (Transcript) Presidents & Prime Ministers, July 1999.
- Access America: Reengineering Through Information Technology. Report of the National Performance Review and the Government Information Technology Services Board, 1997.
- "Basic Principles for Building an Information Society." USIA Electronic Journals, Vol. 1, No. 12, September 1996.
- "Bringing Information to the World: The Global Information Infrastructure." Harvard Journal of Law & Technology 9, 1 (Winter 1996).
- "The Metaphor of Distributed Intelligence." Science, VOl 272 12 April 1996: 177–80.
- The Technology Challenge: How Can America Spark Private Innovation? by Vice President Al Gore, University of Pennsylvania, February 14, 1996
- "The Technology Challenge: What is the Role of Science in American Society?", Prepared Remarks of Vice President Al Gore. American Association for the Advancement of Science, Baltimore, MD. February 12, 1996
- Vice President Al Gore's introduction to Earthwatch: 24 Hours In Cyberspace. February 8, 1996. 24 Hours in Cyberspace
- "Innovation delayed is innovation denied," Computer, vol. 27, no. 12, December, 1994: 45–47.
- "No more information haves and have-nots", Billboard, Vol. 106 Issue 43, October 22, 1994: 6.
- 1994 Discover Awards: Introduction, Discover, October, 1994.
- Remarks As Delivered by Vice President Al Gore at the International Telecommunication Union, Monday, March 21, 1994
- "We're all going to be connected (Letter to the editor)." The Wall Street Journal, 28 February 1994: A15.
- Remarks as Delivered by Vice President Al Gore to The Superhighway Summit, Royce Hall, UCLA, January 11, 1994 – The Superhighway Summit
- "The Role of Networking." Communications Week, January 3, 1994: 17.
- Remarks on the National Information Infrastructure by Vice President Al Gore at the National Press club, December 21, 1993
- 1993 Discover Awards: Introduction, Discover, October, 1993.
- "Infrastructure for the global village: computers, networks and public policy." Scientific American Special Issue on Communications, Computers, and Networks, September 1991. 265(3): 150–153.
- "Information Superhighways: The Next Information Revolution." The Futurist, January–February 1991, Vol. 25: 21–23.
- High Performance Computing and Communication Act of 1991 Pub. L. 102–194, (S.272)
- "The Digitization of Schools," BusinessWeek, 10 December 1990.
- "Networking the Future: We Need a National Superhighway for Computer Information", The Washington Post, 15 July 1990: B3.
- "The Information Superhighways of Tomorrow." Academic Computing Magazine. November 1989 Volume 4 Number 3.
- "Congressional Record: Presentation on the National High Performance Computer Technology Act" and "Opening Remarks before the Senate Subcommittee on Science, Technology, and Space by Senator Al Gore" in "National high performance computer technology act: SIGGRAPH and national high-tech public policy issues" by Donna J. Cox, Computer Graphics, Volume 23, Issue 4, August 1989: 276–280.
