= Izone (disambiguation) =

Izone commonly refers to the South Korean-Japanese idol girl group Iz*One.

Izone or iZone may refer to:

- Izone, Rolleston, a business park in the Selwyn District in New Zealand
- Polaroid i-Zone, instant camera products
- iZone, a WiFi hotspot system in Etisalat, UAE
- iZone, an eyewear business in Massachusetts with stores listed at exits on the Massachusetts Turnpike
- Innovation zone
  - A program in New York City Public Schools, as referenced in Globaloria
