= Thinking Pictures =

American media company

- Type: Private
- Industry: Software, Media
- Founded: 1993
- Founder: Stephan Fitch
- Headquarters: Redwood City, California, United States
- Area served: Worldwide
- Key people: Stephan Fitch (President)
- Services: Consulting
- Website: thinkingpictures.com

Thinking Pictures is an American multinational corporation specializing in software, media, and consulting. It was founded in 1993 by Stephan Fitch and Olivier Pfeiffer. Thinking Pictures has introduced a number of innovations in the fields of Internet technology, interactivity, and digital rights management.

== History ==
After its foundation in 1993, Thinking Pictures established partnerships with the media industry. One of its first large projects was an Internet broadcast of a Rolling Stones concert. 20 minutes of video were broadcast at 10 frames per second, utilizing the Mbone. This was the first time a major artist had broadcast a live concert over the Internet, paving the way for modern webcasting. Thinking Pictures was a finalist for the first annual 1995 NII Awards in the category of Arts and Entertainment for this event. Thinking Pictures continued to broadcast concerts by other recording artists, including Tori Amos and Duncan Sheik.

In 1995, Thinking Pictures launched rock.com, which used a proprietary webcasting technology to provide on-demand music videos. The site was one of the first to integrate web-based media, e-commerce, and social networking.

In 1996, Thinking Pictures partnered with Universal Music Group to develop a digital content description language. This was integrated into the Universal Media Player interface, also developed by Thinking Pictures and licensed to UMG, and distributed on over 1 billion music compact discs between 1998 and 2005. This was a major innovation in digital rights management, providing a way for artists to include electronic press kits (EPKs) or other information on CDs. Thinking Pictures continued to develop the UMP as a platform-independent device which could make DRM more widely available within the music industry.

Thinking Pictures founder Stephan Fitch also founded Squib International in 1999, gaining a patent for wearable video. Fitch partnered with MSN, which featured the new technology at a conference in May 2000.

In 2000, Thinking Pictures partnered with a number of national movie theater chains to produce interactive displays for theater lobbies. The ThinkPix Smart Displays are capable of showing full-motion video. They also integrate cameras to report on the performance of trailers and posters shown on the display. The Smart Displays are also capable of interacting with viewers; planned future upgrades include the ability to read smart cards provided to moviegoers by theaters, tailoring trailers and other content to the preferences of individual moviegoers.

Around this time, Thinking Pictures also began developing the proprietary Interactive Visual Content Architecture (IVCA). The technology is intended to use information about audiences and feedback from sensors during a film screening to alter the film, giving each audience a tailored narrative and increasing satisfaction with the experience.

== Recent company developments ==
Thinking Pictures is currently collaborating with The New York Times on a network of digital newsracks, called the Timestation Digital Newsracks. The Timestation devices display random samples of a newspaper’s content and allow users to manage their online subscriptions. About 50 Timestations are deployed, mostly in New York City. The Wall Street Journal is also experimenting with the technology.

== See also ==
- Stephan Fitch
- Webcasting
- Digital rights management
