= High Performance Computing Act of 1991 =

United States Act of Congress

- Long title: An Act to provide for a coordinated Federal program to ensure continued United States leadership in high-performance computing.
- Acronyms (colloquial): HPCA
- Nicknames: Gore Bill
- Enacted by: the 102nd United States Congress
- Effective: December 9, 1991

Citations
- Public law: 102-194
- Statutes at Large: 105 Stat. 1594

Codification
- Titles amended: 15 U.S.C.: Commerce and Trade
- U.S.C. sections created: 15 U.S.C. ch. 81 § 5501

Legislative history
- Introduced in the Senate as S. 272 by Al Gore (D-TN) on January 24, 1991; Committee consideration by Senate Commerce, Science, and Transportation Subcommittee and Subcommittee on Science, Technology, and Space; Passed the Senate on September 11, 1991 (passed); Passed the House on November 20, 1991 (passed) with amendment; Senate agreed to House amendment on November 22, 1991 (agreed); Signed into law by President George H. W. Bush on December 9, 1991

The High Performance Computing Act of 1991 (HPCA) is an Act of Congress promulgated in the 102nd United States Congress as (Pub.L. 102–194) on December 9, 1991. Often referred to as the Gore Bill, it was created and introduced by then Senator Al Gore, and led to the development of the National Information Infrastructure, the funding of the National Research and Education Network (NREN), and the High-Performance Computing and Communications Program (HPCC).

The funding allocation was approximately $600 million.

== Background ==
The act built on prior U.S. efforts of developing a national networking infrastructure, starting with the technological foundation of the ARPANET in the 1960s and continuing through the funding of the National Science Foundation Network (NSFnet) in the 1980s. The renewed effort became known in popular language as building the Information superhighway. It also included the High-Performance Computing and Communications Initiative and spurred many significant technological developments, such as the Mosaic web browser, and the creation of a high-speed fiber optic computer network.

== Development and passage ==
Senator Al Gore developed the Act after hearing the 1988 report Toward a National Research Network submitted to Congress by a group chaired by UCLA professor of computer science Leonard Kleinrock, one of the creators of the ARPANET, which is regarded as the earliest precursor network of the Internet.

The bill was enacted on December 9, 1991, and led to the National Information Infrastructure (NII) which Gore referred to as the "Information superhighway". President George H. W. Bush predicted that the Act would help "unlock the secrets of DNA," open up foreign markets to free trade, and a promise of cooperation between government, academia, and industry.

== Results ==
The Gore Bill helped fund the National Center for Supercomputing Applications at the University of Illinois, where a team of programmers, including Netscape founder Marc Andreessen, created the Mosaic Web browser in 1993, the commercial Internet's technological springboard credited as beginning the Internet boom of the 1990s. Andreessen later remarked that 'If it had been left to private industry, it wouldn't have happened ... at least, not until years later.'

Gore reiterated the role of government financing in American success in a 1996 speech when he, as vice president, said, "That's how it has worked in America. Government has supplied the initial flicker—and individuals and companies have provided the creativity and innovation that kindled that spark into a blaze of progress and productivity that's the envy of the world."

== CNN interview ==
Following a 1999 CNN interview, then-Vice President Gore became the subject of some controversy and ridicule when his claim that he "took the initiative in creating the Internet" was widely quoted out of context or misquoted, with comedians and the popular media taking his expression as a claim that he had personally invented the Internet. George W. Bush, Gore's opponent in the 2000 presidential election, mocked Gore's claim during his acceptance speech before the Republican National Convention that year.

The meaning of the statement, which referred to his legislative support of key technologies in the development of the Internet, was widely reaffirmed by notable Internet pioneers, such as Vint Cerf and Bob Kahn, who stated, "No one in public life has been more intellectually engaged in helping to create the climate for a thriving Internet than the Vice President".

== President's Information Technology Advisory Committee ==
PITAC was started in 1991 under the High Performance Computing Act of 1991. On May 28, 2003, President George W. Bush extended the committee.

== See also ==
- High performance computing
- Timeline of the history of the Internet
