= YWLA =

YWLA may refer to:

- Young Workers League of America (YWL), now Young Communist League USA
- Young Women's Leadership Academy (disambiguation), a name used by several public all-girls' schools in Texas.
