= Schlumberger SEED =

SEED
- Company type: Non-profit division of public enterprise
- Industry: education, science
- Founded: 1998
- Headquarters: Operates in 40+ countries
- Website: www.planetseed.com

SEED, also known as Schlumberger Excellence in Educational Development, is a global non-profit educational outreach organization within Schlumberger Limited, the global oilfield services company.

The mission of SEED is to inspire, influence and enable educators in underserved communities where Schlumberger people live and work to engage youth in science and technology. SEED aims to build learning communities and knowledge-sharing environments in which students, educators and volunteers collaborate on projects in their local languages.

== History ==
SEED was founded in 1998 "to help bridge the digital divide" by providing science knowledge and technology (computer and Internet resources) to underserved communities around the world where the company's employees lived and work. The acronym SEED, which stands for Schlumberger Excellence in Educational Development, describes the nascent enterprise of providing volunteer support and technology to Schlumberger communities. SEED signed its first agreement with a school in Venezuela to launch a pilot program and soon thereafter outfitted the school with computers, Internet service and volunteers who provided technical support.

Over the ensuing years, SEED expanded internationally. In 2003, SEED began hosting hands-on educational workshops to advance the SEED focus on experiential learning. In 2006, SEED changed the name of its Connectivity Grant Program to the School Network Program (SNP) to more accurately reflect its work and relationships with granted educational institutions. In 2007, during its 10th operating year, SEED signed its 200th SNP grant contract, again with a school in Venezuela, and in 2008, SEED entered its 40th country.

SEED has ongoing collaborations with the MIT Media Lab, iEARN, MaMaMedia, Professional Thinking Partners (SmartWired), Milton Glaser Inc., OLPC (One Laptop Per Child) and the Society for Organizational Learning (SoL), among other educational organizations.

== See also ==
Seymour Papert: The Children's Machine: Rethinking School in the Age of the Computer

Seymour Papert: Mindstorms: Children, Computers, and Powerful Ideas

Dawna Markova: The Smart Parenting Revolution

Peter Senge: The Fifth Discipline: The Art & Science of the Learning Organization

== Honors ==
Performed by Schlumberger Bronze Award (2005)

World Petroleum Council Excellence Awards - Social Responsibility (2002)
