= National Information Infrastructure =

1991 USA telecommunications policy

The National Information Infrastructure (NII) was the product of the High Performance Computing Act of 1991. It was a telecommunications policy buzzword, which was popularized during the Clinton Administration under the leadership of Vice-President Al Gore.

== Proposal ==
It proposed to build communications networks, interactive services, interoperable computer hardware and software, computers, databases, and consumer electronics in order to put vast amounts of information available to both public and private sectors. NII was to have included more than just the physical facilities (more than the cameras, scanners, keyboards, telephones, fax machines, computers, switches, compact disks, video and audio tape, cable, wire, satellites, optical fiber transmission lines, microwave nets, switches, televisions, monitors, and printers) used to transmit, store, process, and display voice, data, and images; it was also to encompass a wide range of interactive functions, user-tailored services, and multimedia databases that were interconnected in a technology-neutral manner that will favor no one industry over any other.

== See also ==
- Al Gore and information technology
- High Performance Computing Act of 1991
- Information superhighway
- History of the Internet
- NII Awards
