= Idit Harel =

Israeli-American entrepreneur

- עידית הראל
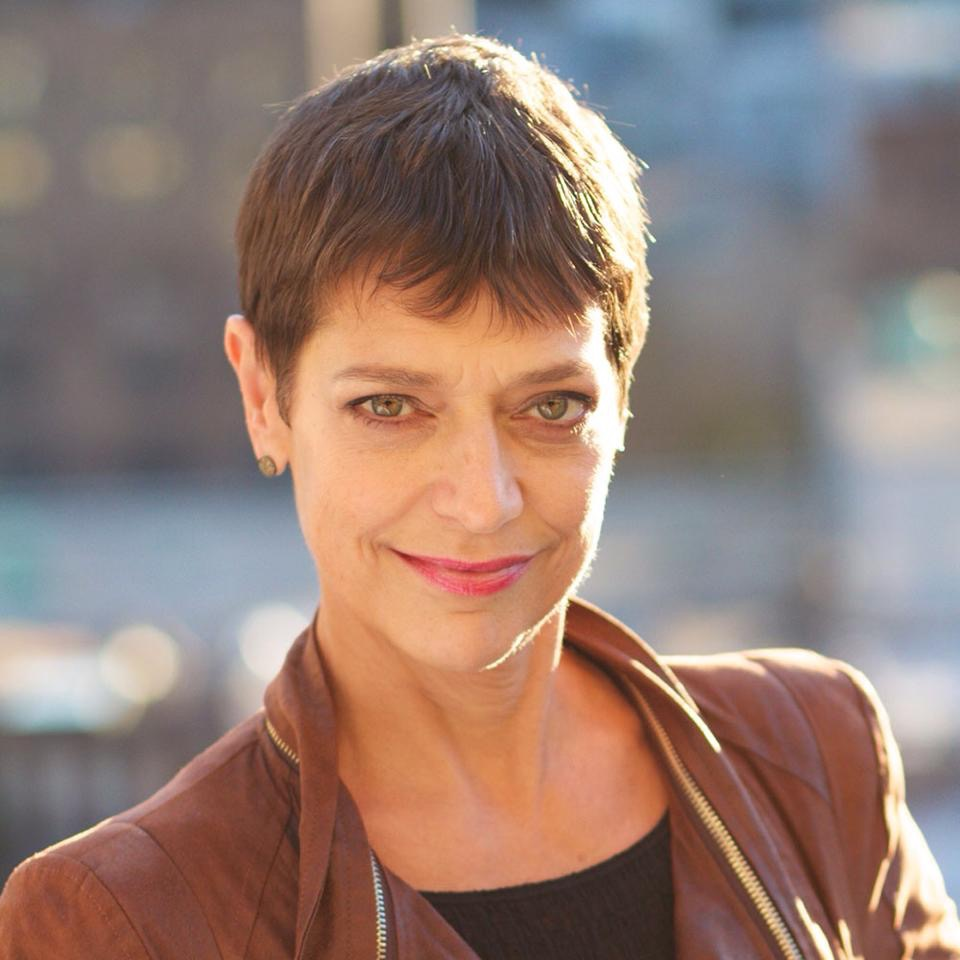
- Born: Idit Ron; September 18, 1958 (age 67); Tel Aviv, Israel
- Education: Massachusetts Institute of Technology; Harvard University; Tel Aviv University
- Known for: MaMaMedia, Inc. Globaloria; World Wide Workshop
- Scientific career
- Fields: Edtech; Entrepreneurship; Social Entrepreneurship; Innovation; Learning Sciences; Human Development

Idit R. Harel (Hebrew: עידית הראל; born Idit Ron; September 18, 1958) is an Israeli-American entrepreneur and CEO of Globaloria. She is researcher of learning sciences and of constructionist learning-based EdTech interventions.

== Overview ==
Harel researches and writes on the impact of computational new media technology on the social and academic development of children and their epistemology. Her MIT Media Lab research with Seymour Papert has contributed to the development of constructionist learning theory. She blogs monthly on Huffington Post Impact and Technology verticals on computer skills education, particularly for young women, girls, and underprivileged children, and the value of massive open online courses (MOOCs) in education reform.

Harel was the founder and CEO of MaMaMedia Inc., the executive director of the MaMaMedia Consulting Group (MCG), and the founder, President, and Chair of the World Wide Workshop, educational technology development companies. She is presently the CEO and a founding Chair of Globaloria, which designs computer learning programs for K-12 schools in the United States.

== Personal life ==
Idit Ron was born in Tel Aviv, Israel. Her parents and their families are Holocaust survivors from Poland and Czechoslovakia. She married her first husband, David Harel, in 1979 (divorced 1995); they have three children. She married her second husband, former West Virginia governor Gaston Caperton, in 2003; they divorced in 2012.

== Career ==
=== Education ===
Harel moved to the United States in 1982 for graduate study at the Harvard Graduate School of Education after having previously received a Bachelor of Arts in Psychology and Philosophy from Tel-Aviv University. She earned two graduate degrees from Harvard: an EdM in Technology in Education (1984) and a Certificate of Advanced Graduate Studies (CAS) in Human Development (1985) from the Harvard Graduate School of Education. In 1988, she earned a Ph.D in Epistemology and Learning Research from MIT after helping to formulate a new constructivist model with Seymour Papert, the "Instructional Software Design Learning Paradigm."

=== Children Designers ===
Harel's research at the Harvard Graduate School of Education and the MIT Media Lab in the 1980s led to the 1991 publication of Children Designers, which won the 1991 Outstanding Book Award from the American Education Research Association, with an introduction by Harel's research collaborator, constructivist researcher Seymour Papert. Children Designers presents the results of Harel's research in which she introduced disadvantaged fourth-grade children from the Boston area to the Logo programming language, and facilitated their creation of mathematical software applications that would help third-grade peers learn fractions. Children Designers suggested implementations within schools that emphasize this project-based and student-centered approach.

=== MaMaMedia ===
In 1995, Harel moved to New York City, where she founded MaMaMedia, an Internet dot-com that offered web services focused on inculcating digital literacy and creative learning skills among children and their parents who used the web games and activities offered. Harel developed MaMaMedia based largely on her research in the MIT Media Lab in the educational principles of constructionism. The site provided web users with a range of "playful learning" activities and projects, publishing the first print magazine for children about the Internet, MaMaMedia: A Kid's Guide to the Net.

=== World Wide Workshop and Globaloria ===
Harel founded World Wide Workshop in 2004, a 501(c)(3) non-profit organization that develops applications for learning with technology that combine game design and online social media experiences for youth to empower them to be inventors and leaders in the global knowledge economy. The foundation's programs aim to transform education by connecting youth to technology learning opportunities in schools and community centers, facilitating children's localized community engagement, and fostering the potential for economic development through game production experiences.

Globaloria is a social learning system and educational program of the World Wide Workshop, in which participating students engage in a range of digital activities. The program was established in 2006 to cultivate both students' and educators' 21st century skills and digital literacy, facilitating mastery of social media technology tools, and students' deeper understanding of curricular areas, such as science, mathematics and health.

== Research and theories ==
=== Clickerati ===
Much of Harel's published work in the 1990s and early 2000s focused on the emergence of what she has termed the "Clickerati Generation" - children born since 1991 who will grow up immersed in new media, and unable to imagine a world without Internet technology. She calls for a radical paradigm shift in the education and acculturation of this generation, emphasizing normalization of digital information and communication, and the cultivation of digital literacy skills for their successful development, citizenship, and leadership within such physical-digital blended environments.

=== Constructionist MOOCs ===
Through the launch of the World Wide Workshop and research on its flagship program Globaloria, Harel has advanced the use of constructionist learning within the MOOC model. She has criticized MOOCs for generally replicating the instructor-led learning model, and asserts that Globaloria's educational tools are the only constructionist MOOCs for middle and high school students. She also states that this approach is unique in simultaneously training teachers and instructors on a blended learning model.

== Honors ==
- 2015: Symmetry 50 "Top Women in NYC Startups"
- 2013: Named to Disruptor Foundation Fellows
- 2012: Journal of Media Literacy Special Issue guest editor: Globaloria
- 2011: Named to Digital Learning Council by Digital Learning Now!
- 2010: Jessie McCanse Award for Individual Contribution to Media Literacy, by the National Telemedia Council.
- 2002: Network of Educators in Science and Technology (NEST) recognized for "devotion, innovation, and imagination in science and technology on behalf of children and youth around the world.", Computerworld Smithsonian Award for Media, Arts and Entertainment: MaMaMedia Peace Project
- 1999: ComputerworldSmithsonian Award for Education: MaMaMedia Internet-centered products for young children and their families
- 1992: Outstanding Book Award for Children Designers, by the American Education Research Association (AERA).
- 1990: Journal of Mathematical Behavior - Outstanding Dissertation Issue: "Interdisciplinary Constructions of Learning and Knowing Mathematics in a Computer-Rich School."

== Bibliography ==
- "Constructionism: Research Reports and Essays, 1985-1990", 1991 (with Seymour Papert)
- "Children Designers: Interdisciplinary Constructions for Learning and Knowing Mathematics in a Computer-rich School", 1991.
- "Constructionist Learning: A 5th Anniversary Collection of Papers Reflecting Research Reports, Projects in Progress, and Essays by the Epistemology & Learning Group", 1990.
