= Cityspace =

CitySpace was an internet-based virtual world launched at SIGGRAPH 1993 by educator and project director Zane Vella. CitySpace was one of the earliest online virtual 3D environments and first came to attention via mainstream news media in late 1993. CitySpace was also the first user-generated virtual world, similar to virtual worlds like Second Life, and enabled participants to contribute 3D computer graphics and digital imagery to a collaborative real-time rendered 3D virtual world in which participants interacted with each other via avatars. CitySpace was active from 1993-1996 and won the 1996 NII Award for Arts and Entertainment.

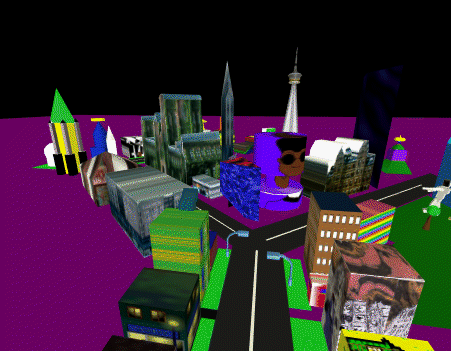
Snapshot view looking down first CitySpace "streets"

Early CitySpace installations at the Boston Computer Museum (1993), Exploratorium (1994 and 1995) and Ontario Science Center (1995) combined educational computer graphics workshops and introduction to internet communications for young people ages 8 to 18. Both during and between CitySpace installations, contributors around the world collaborated via email and early internet video tools including CU-SeeMe to create avatars, buildings, vehicles and virtual toys.

CitySpace installations consisted of networked Silicon Graphics Onyx Reality Engine supercomputers, Macintosh-based 3D modeling and graphics software, videoconferencing and data projection. The CitySpace software, written by Chris Cederwall of the Electronic Visualization Laboratory, enabled real-time rendering, six degrees of avatar motion, text chat, and peer-to-peer communication between CitySpace clients for sharing avatar position information, chat content, and graphics updates.

In 1994 CitySpace was also featured in the Cave Automatic Virtual Environment at the SIGGRAPH '94 VROOM event, a demonstration of the state of virtual reality technology.

== Participants ==
The CitySpace project team included Coco Conn (producer), Zane Vella (director), Chris Cederwall (programmer), Jim Damiano (3D modeler), David Goldberg (educator), Ann Hess (mentor), Ole Lutjens (artist), Jim Thompson (network guru), and Daniel Blackman (collaborator)
