= Superhighway Summit =

The Superhighway Summit was held at the University of California, Los Angeles's Royce Hall on 11 January 1994. It was the first public conference bringing together all of the major industry, government and academic leaders in the field. It began the national dialogue about the information superhighway and its implications. The conference was organized by Richard Frank of the Academy of Television Arts & Sciences, and Jeffrey Cole and Geoffrey Cowan, the former co-directors of UCLA's Center for Communication Policy. It was introduced by former UCLA Chancellor Andrea L. Rich. The keynote speaker was Vice President Al Gore.

== Background ==
Thirty leaders in the area of communications presided over the event, which had an attendance of over 1800 people. It was broadcast live on C-SPAN, E! Entertainment, and on the UCLA campus.

== Partial list of participants ==
- Barry Diller - chairman and CEO of QVC
- Michael Eisner - then chairman and CEO of the Walt Disney Co.
- Ernestine, the telephone operator (a fictional character created by the actress Lily Tomlin for Rowan & Martin's Laugh-In)
- Al Gore - then Vice President of the United States
- Reed Hundt - FCC Chairman
- Robert Iger -president of the ABC Television Group
- Jeffrey Katzenberg - then chairman of Walt Disney Studios
- John C. Malone - president of Telecommunications, Inc.
- Rupert Murdoch - NewsCorp
- Raymond W. Smith - CEO, Bell Atlantic

== Highlights ==
The conference was given extensive coverage by Cynthia Lee and Linda Steiner Lee over two issues of UCLA TODAY (January 13 and 27, 1994). In the article "Gore Details Telecommunications Ideas," Lee and Lee gave an overview of the opening speech given by Vice President Gore. They commented that "Vice President Al Gore outlined the Clinton Administration's proposals to reform the communications marketplace and challenged his audience to provide links from the so-called information superhighway to every classroom, library, hospital, and clinic in the country by the year 2000 [...] 'We have a dream for...an information superhighway that can save lives, create jobs and give every American, young and old, the chance for the best education available to anyone, anywhere,' Gore said." During his talk, "Ernestine" (the fictional telephone operator created by Lily Tomlin for Rowan & Martin's Laugh-In) made a surprise appearance. She complained "about the confusing and rapid transformation of communications technology. The Vice president laughingly assured Ernestine that the new technology would be simple to understand and available to all Americans."

In the follow-up article, "CEOs Ponder Direction of Information Superhighway", Cynthia Lee stated that leaders at the conference noted that the future of the information superhighway was still uncertain. " 'Here we are, all ready to go cruising off down this new information superhighway,' said Jeffrey Katzenberg, Chairman of The Walt Disney Studios, during one of the panel discussions, 'and we really don't know where we are going. It's the first time we will be moving in a certain direction when we don't even know our final destination.' " Geoffrey Cowan, the former co-director of UCLA's Center for Communication Policy, indicated that the key concept of the Information Superhighway was interactivity, or "the ability for the consumer to control it, to decide what they want to receive, and the ability of the technology to respond to highly sophisticated consumer demands."

The participants underscored the point that the major challenge of the information superhighway would lie in access, or the "gap between those who will have access to it because they can afford to equip themselves with the latest electronic devices and those who can't."

== See also ==
- Al Gore and information technology
- History of the Internet
