= Andrew Targowski =

American computer scientist (born 1937)

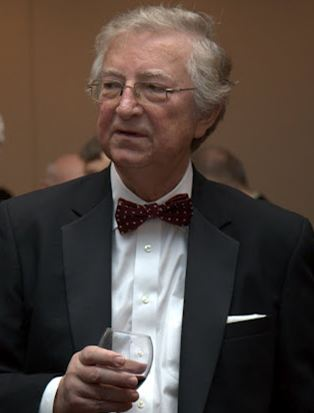
- Born: October 9, 1937 (age 89); Warsaw, Poland
- Education: Warsaw Politechnic
- Known for: INFOSTRADA, PESEL, e-enterprise architecture, BOMP/BOSP, semantic ladder, information laws, service laws, automation laws, civilization laws, Death Triangle of Civilization, wisdom theory, Spirituality 2.0, wise civilization
- Scientific career
- Fields: Cognitive informatics; Civilization study; Philosophy; Political science
- Workplaces: RAWAR, ORGMASZ, ZETO, KBI (Poland); Western Michigan University (USA)

Andrew (Andrzej) Stanislaw Targowski (born October 9, 1937) is a Polish–American computer scientist specializing in enterprise computing, societal computing, information technology impact upon civilization, information theory, wisdom theory, and civilization theory. One of the pioneers of applied information systems in Poland, he is an executive, university professor, scientist, civilizationist, philosopher, visionary, writer, and generalist.

In Poland he is known for developing a computerized the social security number (PESEL, 1972–74) for 38 million citizens, a prototype of INFOSTRADA (1972–1974), and authoring of the first books on applied information technology in business, economy, and society. In the United States he has developed one of the first digital cities in the U.S., teleCITY of Kalamazoo, Michigan (1992–1996). He concentrated on the cognitive informatics-oriented development of the theories of enterprise-wide system, information, communication, civilization, and wisdom.

== Biography ==
Targowski was born in Warsaw, Poland. His father, Stanislaw, Adam (1893–1945) was a lawyer, diplomat, politician, and writer. Targowski's father was arrested by the Germans in 1940 and sent to Auschwitz, later to Gross-Rosen and Nordhausen Mittelbau-Dora, where he was a slave worker for the production of V1 and V2 weapons. On March 21, 1945, he was publicly executed by hanging for sabotaging that production. Targowski's mother Halina Krzyrzanska-Targowska (1907–1975) was born on her parents' large estate in Eastern Poland-Podole, now in Ukraine. She was a teenager when the Russian Revolution 1917 devastated her family, which resulted in her escaping to Warsaw. During the Warsaw (Polish) Uprising (September 1944) she was wounded 14 times. She was able to take out her son Andrew (then 7 years old) from a pile of corpses, after the execution. After the War, Targowski went to the private (later nationalized) W.Gòrski School in Warsaw. When Joseph Stalin died on March 23, 1953, he and other boys shot air guns at pictures of the state officials, hanging in a classroom, celebrating the too soon conceived victory over the occupiers. Consequently, he was expelled from the school and completed his baccalaureate at the T. Reytan School in Warsaw in 1954. He married Alicja Kowalczyk in 1962 and has a son Stan (Stanislaw – computer scientist). After his divorce, he remarried Irmina Dura-Kubas (MD and Ph.D.) in 1978 and has a son John (attorney) and a step-daughter Agnieszka (geophysicist), and three grandchildren; Julian (computer professional), Marcel and Veronica.

== Education ==
Targowski graduated from the Warsaw Politechnic (1961) from the Faculty of Industrial Engineering. Defended in a public presentation a master's degree thesis on "The Computerized Integrated Information Systems in the RAWAR T1 Factory," which was making military and civilian (commercial navy) radars. In 1962 he formulated (behind the Iron Curtain) the model of a list of parts and components (Bill of Material Processor – BOMP) for highly complex products, characterized by 19 levels of assemblies and thousands of components. Nowadays, this kind of systems is called ERP. It was the first master thesis on Management Information Systems defended in Poland. During his study at the Warsaw Politechnic he actively participated in the famous Students Unrest in October 1956. This students' protest ended the Stalinist Era in Poland, but the "liberal" totalitarian dictatorship was still intact. As a penalty, he lost scholarship, and had to take a part-time job as a draftsman at an engineering bureau, designing brick factories. In 1969, Targowski defended his PhD dissertation on "The Conditions of the Optimization of Hierarchical Management Information Systems" at the Warsaw Politechnic. He proved in his dissertation that the optimal configuration of a hierarchical computer infrastructure had to be composed of mainframe and minicomputers. It defied the official state strategy, which preferred the development of mainframes only, since that kind of a strategy was pursued by the Soviet Union. He later supported Jacek Karpiński, a famous Polish designer of minicomputers (KARP and K-202). During his professional life he passed an intensive computer training at IBM schools in Belgium, Austria, the United Kingdom, and the U.S. He also passed an intensive computer training at the French company BULL in Paris in 1962–1964 and later in 1966 in United Kingdom, at ICT/ICL and NCR.

== Work in Poland ==
As a student, he was a co-author of the first National Program for the Development of Information Technology in Poland (Economic Council of the Council of Ministers – KERM 400, 1961). In 1962 he founded the first Polish Systems Analysis Laboratory at the Institute of Machine Industry Organization (ORGMASZ). In this workshop, according to KERM Resolution 400, he participated as an executive in the design of the first Polish computer business management information systems at RAWAR (radars factory) – 1961, the Radio Plant Marcin Kasprzak in Warsaw – 1962, the Lamp Plant R. Luxemburg in Warsaw −1962, Truck plant in Starachowice – 1966 (ICT 1301). In 1966, he was able to bring to Poland the IBM 1440 machine, which was the first such contract with IBM then behind the Iron Curtain. Between 1965 and 1971 as the first employee and CEO of Warsaw's ZETO-Zowar participated in the establishment of networks between Poland's 50 ZETO regional centers pl:ZETO. ZETO computer centers employed about 5000 computer professionals. In ZETO-Zowar he initiated and oversaw the design of the first in Poland (1966) Production Calculation Software Package – now called ERP (BOMP, MRP I and MRP II) – advanced industrial processing systems, supporting integrated production management in the automotive plant FSO and Nowotko diesel engine plant in Warsaw, first on IBM 1440, and later on IBM System/360 mainframes.

As a volunteer he took part in the planning of the second National Informatics Development Plan for the years 1971–1975. He took over the design of the system nationwide directory of personal social security number: PESEL/Magister/PESEL (1972–1974). He developed the WEKTOR system for accounting and control of public investments (1972–1974). As the deputy director general of the National Office of Information Technology (1971–1974), he developed the concept of INFOSTRADA (Information Superhighway), that concept returned in U.S. 20 years later reinvented by staff of senator Al Gore) and the National Information System (KSI). INFOSTRADA and KSI development plans were hindered by the political authorities as too risky for the dictatorship of the communist system, because they promoted the free flow of information in society. From that moment the trouble started for Targowski's employment and publishing, and organized harassment of his person began: in 1977, he was removed from the editorial board of Informatyka pl:Informatyka (czasopismo),(a computer journal first called Maszyny Matematyczne (Mathematical Machines) which he co-founded in 1966), his publications were blocked. Then he was fired from consecutive jobs. Employed at the Institute of Building Machines in Kobyłka, he was asked to be absent at work. As a result of harassment he began efforts to go abroad. He was Poland's delegate to the Working Group on Automation at the United Nations (Geneva), (1972–74)

== Work in the United States ==
In January 1980 Targowski (through a Polish foreign trade agency Polservice, specializing in exporting Polish professionals) went to Mexico, and then in 1980 to the United States where he got political asylum. In the U.S., he worked in the Hamilton College (1974–1975), Western Michigan University (1980–1982) Hofstra University (1982–1983), Eastern Kentucky University (1984), and the longest, from 1985 until today, as a professor of computer information systems in Western Michigan University, Kalamazoo, Michigan. In the 1990s he was first a chairman of the board overseeing the development of a teleCITY of Kalamazoo, in 1996 he was a director of that project, which he managed as a research project, simultaneously working as a faculty at Western Michigan University. In the United States, his experience on information highways (INFOSTRADA) from Poland, led to the launch of one of America's first digital city projects—Telecity of Kalamazoo (1996).

In the U.S. he specializes in areas such as strategy and architecture of integrated enterprise systems, semantic ladder, futurology, modeling of civilization theory, multiculturalism, the theory of wisdom and theory of information. In total Targowski independently published 40 books (in English, Polish, and Italian), and additionally with co-authors 10 chapters of other books in English. He also developed about 180 scientific and professional articles in Polish and English.

== Volunteer work in professional associations in the United States ==
- IRMA, Information Resources Management Association – president of advisory council (1995–2003).
- ISCSC, The International Society for the Comparative Study of Civilizations – president (2007–2013).
- Foreign Member of Academy of Engineering in Poland (Akademia Inżynierska w Polsce, 200 elected members out of 120,000 engineers)[www.akademiainzynierska.pl].
- World Research Council of Polonia (Światowa Rada Badań nad Polonią) – president (2001–2007)
- Colleagues International – president (1999–2001).
- Northern American Polish Engineer Council (Rada Inżynierów Polskich w Ameryce Północnej) – founder (2003), director (2003–2011), vicepresident (od 2011).
- Polonia Technica, New York – honorary member .
- Polish Tennis Association (Polski Związek Tenisowy) – president (1971–1972).
- Northern American Polish Studies (Północnoamerykańskie Studium ds. Polskich), chief editor of Studium Library (1990–2000).
- Polish Institute of Arts and Sciences of America (Polski Instytut Naukowy i Sztuki) New York, member .
- Polish Scientific Society in Exile (Polskie Towarzystwo Naukowe na Obczyźnie), London, member .
- Józef Piłsudski Institute of America (Instytut im. Józefa Piłsudskiego), New York, member
- American Polish Advisory Council, Washington, D.C.
- Dialogue and Universalism, Advisory Council vice-chairman .
- Association of the Children of Uprising 1944, honorary president

== Theory of enterprise-wide systems ==
Targowski based his master thesis on his involvement in the development of enterprise-wide systems in the heavy machinery industry in Poland, while in the U.S. defined his first version of the theory of enterprise-wide systems. It is composed of the Generic Enterprise Processive Model, Bill of Systems Processor (BOSP), the Federational Architecture of Information Management Complex, and the System Planning Technique of Enterprise-wide IMS. He published this theory in Journal of Management Information Systems, Fall 1988 (vol.5, no.2, pp. 23–38). He expanded this theory into the Architecture of Hierarchical IMS, strategic and tactical planning of enterprise-wide systems and defining the generic systems architectures for such systems as MIS, control system, Management Support System, Manufacturing Operation IS, Construction Operation IS, Office IS, and Home IS. He published these in his book The Architecture and Planning of Enterprise-wide IMS (1990). He continued the development of this theory by defining models of 8 enterprise systems configurations; off-line enterprise, on-line enterprise, integrated enterprise, agile enterprise, informated enterprise, communicated enterprise, mobile enterprise, electronic enterprise, and virtual enterprise. This approach should provide a clear target for the enterprise systems software development, just as in civil engineering the architecture of a church should be different from that of a school. To understand the invisible complexity of thousands of electronic systems of an enterprise, he defined the generic architecture of Enterprise Information Infrastructure, composed of 6 layers, such as 1-Telecommunication Layer, 2-Computer Networks Layer, 3-Internet Layer, 4-Computing Layer, 5-Communication Layer, and 6-Application Layer. He also defined analytical approaches to align business and IT strategies and published these new approaches in his book Electronic Enterprise: Strategy and Architecture (2003). He generalized the Enterprise Systems Approach through the classification of enterprises into the following categories; industrial enterprise, service enterprise, electronic enterprise, virtual enterprise, value-creation enterprise, sustainable enterprise and defined their basic characteristics. He also defined the evolution of the enterprise systems development and published these new approaches in his chapter on The Enterprise Systems Approach in the book Social, Managerial, and Organizational Dimensions of Enterprise Information Systems(2010) edited by Maria Manuela Cruz-Cunha. Further work led him to defining the generic architecture of a service enterprise, what he published in his paper on The Architecture of Service Systems as the Framework for the Definition of Service Science Scope in International Journal of Information Systems in the Service Sector, January–March 2009, vol.1, No.1. In 2009 he expanded his approach to enterprise systems by presenting his information systems-based model of a sustainable enterprise at the International Conference CENTERIS-2009, October 7–9 in Ofir, Portugal—How to Transform the Information Infrastructure with respect to sustainability and global-orientation, and to Monitor and Predict the Sustainability of Civilization: the Organizational and Social Aspect. (Proceedings, pp. 17–28). He generalized mathematically the generic model of hierarchical information systems in his chapter on "Info-Mathics-The Mathematical Modelling of Information systems (including BOSP)" in L. Favre's book (2003).

== Information society ==
Targowski was involved in the development of an Information society since the early 1970s, when he promoted the development of INFOSTRADA in Poland. In that time he thought that this network will trigger the development of the Informed Society in a totalitarian state. However, the rulers had no interest in accomplishing that vision. On the other hand, the Dictatorship failed in 1989 with one of the main factors being the volume of underground uncensored press exceeding the volume of the official press, and it led to the rise of the Informed Society. While in the U.S., published a paper on "Computing in Totalitarian States: Poland's Way to an Informed society" (Information Executive, Summer 1991). In pursuing this issue he defined the taxonomy of an information Society, differentiating its 14 segments and offering a path of their development. He published it as a chapter in Y-chen Lan's book (2005). In 2008 he was asked by Ernst & Young to plan the Information Society for Poland. He developed a comprehensive set of models for the state, regions, cities, and villages. He published it as a chapter in his book Information Technology and Societal Development (2009).

== Electronic global village ==
Targowski recognized in the 1980s that Marshall McLuhan's concept of the Global Village must be extended into the Electronic Global Village, despite the fact that the Internet was conceived just in 1983, after splitting ARPANET into MILNET and the Internet. He presented his concept at the II International Conference of Information Resource Management Association on May 22, 1991, in Memphis, Tennessee, and published about the new rising phenomenon in a paper on Strategies and Architecture of the Electronic Global Village in The Information Society-An International Journal, analyzing also issues To Build or Not to Build? and To Inform or to Control? After 22 years (2012), the first question got a positive answer, but the answer for the second question is still pending, due to the rising tendency by some agents "to control."

== Theory of information ==
Targowski found some difficulties in designing information systems for business and administration who did not know the meaning of information. The quantitative theory of information (formulated by Hartley and Shannon) defines information as I = -Log_{2} p(α). In business activities, if someone on Tuesday says that tomorrow is Wednesday, p=1 and then I=0. However, on Wednesday there may be a discount at a given store, what is very meaningful for an information user. He thinks that the traditional theory of information mostly deals with its syntax in a general sense, answering the question of how to process information. Therefore, he developed the approach based upon its semantics, which means answering the question what information to process? He invented the concept of the Semantic Ladder, composed of the following units of cognition, organized as steps (levels); 1-DATA (measurement), 2-Information (change), 3-Concept (direction), 4-Knowledge (principles, rules, laws), 5-Wisdom (judgment & choice). First time he published this DICKW model in his book The Architecture and Planning of Enterprise-wide Information Management Systems (1990:136), consequently he began to improving its graphic model in his following books (2003:115, 2009:223, 2011:27). In his book (2009) he defined several perspectives and images of information. This approach defines the differentiated frameworks of IS design in the scope of data processing, information processing, concept processing, knowledge processing, and wisdom processing. He also differentiated approaches to information's conceptualization at the level of the macro-information ecology. It allowed him to define four universal laws of information:

- Law I: The complexity of the ecosystem (man, material, information, and nature) is proportional to the level of the existing information reservoir.
- Law II: Information generates consequences, which it cannot foresee.
- Law III: The precision and certitude of information is proportional to the simplicity of the object of information or inversely proportional to the complexity of the object.
- Law IV: The progress of the Information Wave generates relative ignorance and interdependence among people and globalizes humanity.

He published these universal information laws in his chapter on The Information Laws in D. White's book in 2002. Later, he included this chapter to his book (2009).

== Theory of communication ==
Targowski recognized in the Information Age, that for Hartley, and for the Shannon and Weaver model of communication process that followed, that interpretation of a communicated message is not part of communication process. In those models communication has no significant, human meaning. Since they care about channel capacity and signal quality. Only Korzybski's model focuses on matters communicated between the sender and receiver to a certain degree. Therefore, Targowski and Joel Bowman developed a new approach based on the semantic reaction paradigm (new in communication theory), which includes more communication components and their role in understanding what is communicated. In consequence, they developed the Layer-based, Pragmatic Model of Communication Process. Those layers/links (Physical, Systems, Session, Environment, Functions & Role, Symbols, Behavior, Value, Storage Retrieval) contribute to the logical understanding of communication between the sender and receiver and as the result generate reflective information. The quality of communication was defined in four possible outcomes; trans-communication, pseudo-communication, miscommunication, and para-communication. They published about it in two papers; "Modeling the Communication Process: The Map is not the Territory." (The Journal of Business Communication, Fall 1987:21–34) and "The Layer-based, Pragmatic Model of the Communication Process." (The Journal of Business Communication, Winter 1988:25–40). In reaction to some critique of this model, Targowski expanded this theory by modeling cognitive processes engaged in communication. He published this in a paper "Beyond a Concept of a Communication Process." (The Journal of Business Communication, Winter 1990:75–86). In the Global Economy very often communicating parties come from different countries or even civilizations. Such a case Targowski and Ali Metwalli classified as asymmetric communication (cross-culture communication). They investigated this kind of communication and defined its mathematical model allowing computation of communication efficiency and communication success probability. They defined the five following rules: Culture Richness Rule I, Communication Climate Rule II, Communication Ability Rule III, Communication Competitive Advantage Rule IV, and Communication Cost Rule V. They also founded that for example if an Egyptian communicates with an American, the former must invest in the cost of successful communication 1.8 more than the latter, due to 20 culture items included in that cost. They published their work as a chapter „The Framework for Cross-culture Communication Process Efficiency and Cost in the Global Economy” in ed. E. Szewczak and C. Snodgrass' book (2002).

== Theory of wisdom ==
According to Targowski's approach, despite wisdom's high status, the first sages had problems in dealing with wisdom and stated that only God(s) have the privilege of having wisdom, and that people must follow their wise recommendations. Even philosophers in modern times continue to think the same way, perhaps due to their disappointment of humans’ unwise dealings. In the last 100 years, the issue of wisdom was treated by science as intelligence. The index of Intelligence Quotient (IQ) scores are used in many contexts: as predictors of educational achievement or special needs, by social scientists who study the distribution of IQ scores in populations and the relationships between IQ score and other variables, and as predictors of job performance and income. However, IQ measures intelligence as the ability of solving problems, but not wisdom per se.

The Targowski approach is based on the cognitive informatics approach and the following premises:

- Every mentally healthy individual has some level of wisdom in thinking and making decisions.
- Wisdom is not knowledge; it is a virtue. However, there is knowledge about wisdom which is just in status nascendi.
- Wisdom, in a very short definition is Prudent Judgment and Choice. Hence, one can perceive a person to be knowledgeable but not necessarily wise, and vice versa.
- Wisdom is not a synonym or an extension of intelligence. Intelligence is the ability to solve problems while wisdom is the final touch in prudent judgment and choosing a good solution among available options.
- Wisdom can be practical, theoretical, global, and universal.
- Wisdom can be taught. Left to the practice only, it is usually applied too late to impact the right course of action. Wisdom is as a plant which must be nurtured to grow.

Wisdom should be monitored in civilization like strategic resources because it is the most important human resource on Earth. Wisdom is time- and context-specific. There are unique wisdoms for different categories or types of mind (Basic-BM, Whole-WM, Global-GM, and Universal-UM), and wisdom means different things at the individual, family, professional, and civilization levels. The Basic Mind is intuitive, communicative, practical, and moral, allowing humans to function in civilization. The Whole Mind adds a theoretical component to the Basic Mind, allowing for knowing through logical reasoning, leading to the development of advanced science and technology. The Global Mind is a Whole Mind that is connected and digital, and allows humans to think beyond their immediate experience and existence. The future of the human mind is the Universal Mind, which will evolve if humans can cooperate to try to save civilization. In consequence, based on the presented empiric review of human wisdom Targowski perceives it in the following manner: Human wisdom is a combination of individual, family, profession, and civilization wisdoms applying, according to the needs: BASIC, WHOLE, GLOBAL, and UNIVERSAL MINDS in order to provide practical, moral, theoretical, and method-oriented worldliness and universality, proceeding to prudent judgments and choices of concepts. They are supported by data, information, and knowledge – leading to conclusions, positions, solutions, decisions, actions, and so forth, which are understandable, competent, and sensitive. In a short, Targowski's practical definition describes wisdom as: Wisdom is based upon skillful judgment and choice driven by the art of life. For many, the art of life still can be a puzzle. The key to this puzzle is in understanding and learning how to cope with the components and factors of wisdom. Targowski perceives the art of life as set of the following traits:be philosophical (know your values), be moral and ethical, control emotions, be reflective:remember-forget-connect, be altruistic, be patient, communicate your solutions, other. He published his wisdom theory in his book (2011). In the Spring 2012 he taught a course on HRS 4900 Wisdom at the Lee Honors College at Western Michigan University (WMU) and published his experience in his book (2012). It was the first course (academic for a credit) on such topic at WMU and perhaps in the U.S.

== Theory of civilization ==
After the fall of Communism in 1989/1991 [triggered by the Polish Revolution Solidarity (1980–1989)]. The New World Order was announced and Francis Fukuyama proclaimed the end of history (1992) and the return to the ideals of the French Revolution. Unfortunately the world became not more peaceful but less, due to the war with terrorism. Samuel Huntington explained it as The Clash of Civilizations (1993). Ever since Targowski has pursued this idea and became an active member of the International Society for the Comparative Study of Civilizations, eventually being elected its president for two terms (2007–2013). During his tenure he tried to transform the Society's interests from the early history of civilization to the current one. He learned a lot from such civilizationists as Arnold Toynbee, Pitirim Sorokin and Matthew Melko. He attempted to define a modern theory of civilization in his book (2009). In contrast to the English-French-American Single Elemental Model (civilization=culture) and the German Two Elemental Model (culture includes civilization) he developed the Three Elemental Model (society-culture-infrastructure). He defined three Grand Laws of Civilizations (2009:35):

- Law I: People have seen themselves as entering the world with a potential of many gifts, and they hope to fulfill these gifts in the development of their own lives (Bronowski and Mazlish 1999).
- Law II: People constantly aim for freedom; the range of this freedom depends on the level of the entity's knowledge, communication ability, and the knowledge of the international community.
- Law III: Mankind consciously steers the development of civilization through the formulation and implementation of the main ideas and values of a given epoch.
- Law IV: The degree of a country's historical success is proportional to a level of harmony among political, social, and economic domains.

Targowski perceives the roots of civilization problems in dynamics of the Death Triangle of Civilization, which is composed of the Population Bomb, Ecological Bomb, and Resources Bomb (book 2009:404). The symptoms of this Triangle are seen today, but they will be more visible about 2050, when population will reach 9–10 billion. To save civilization, we should grow 3% in the whole third millennium, while the practical growth at the world level reaches 1–3% per year. To save our civilization he thinks that one must develop a Wise Civilization. The first condition of the design of the architecture of a Wise Civilization is civilians undertaking to introduce the second level of complementary "religion" - spirituality, which can be called Spirituality 2.0. It does not replace any of the existing Religions 1.0, which would not only be a heresy, but an outrageous revolution, impossible to win, but also an unnecessary and harmful. The point is not to fight religion but that it should grow at the global level rather than in some areas of the world. Spirituality 2.0 would teach complementary morality, founded upon the most essential values of the particular Religions 1.0 such ones as those which steer these civilizations: Western, Eastern, Chinese, Japanese, Islamic, Hindu, Buddhist, African (eclectic). The aggregation of those complementary values should lead to the development of the Universal-Complementary Civilization--"Wise Civilization" since will be built upon tolerance ("love your foreigner") (2011:206).

Targowski thinks that over the last 200 years, civilization used three socio-political systems: Capitalism, Socialism and Communism, as well as their various combinations. None of these systems can control the Universal-Complementary Civilization. In this situation, a new socio-political system needs to be developed, which Targowski calls Ecologism, from the word ecosystem, a synonym of biosphere. The following aims will be set before it:

- Mission: implementing the policies of sustainable development of civilization.
- Aim: controlling population growth and the consumption of resources in such a manner that the next generation will have the same living conditions as the previous one.
- Strategy: sufficiency versus efficiency, with the society evolving towards a wise society.
- Main policies:
  - Nature is the most important.
  - People are more important than markets.
  - People's health is more important than money.
  - Sufficiency is more important than efficiency.
  - Business is subservient to and controlled by society.
- Ecologism includes the following subsystems:
  - Eco-education – based on eco-knowledge and wisdom.
  - Wise society – trained and educated in the knowledge of eco-education and having qualifications to wise decision-making.
  - Eco-democracy — all equal to each other but not to the environment, which is supreme to man.
  - Eco-justice – any violation of the law must also be assessed against and possibly punished for possible harm done to the environment.
  - Eco-infrastructure – operates in harmony with Nature and protects it against destruction.
  - Deep Economy – includes environmental and social costs alongside those of business and administration into cost-effectiveness calculations.
  - Deep media – comprehensively and impartially inform the society of the plight and development of the sustainable civilization.

Proponents of the Wise Civilization concept argue that it would not develop under laissez-faire conditions, and that the risk of civilizational collapse justifies a degree of social engineering combining bottom-up and top-down approaches. In this view, both international organizations such as the UN and non-governmental organizations have essential roles. Proponents also call on schools and universities to develop ecological knowledge and wisdom and to train "wise graduates", who are expected to apply such solutions as citizens, workers and leaders and thereby contribute to a Wise Society and Wise Civilization.

Targowski is a realist and thinks that the likelihood of the introduction of the enforcement of Spirituality 2.0 is currently very small but given the good will of those involved, and particularly if they prove wise, might be possible.

== Theory of economics ==
Targowski as a generalist took the civilization and wisdom approaches to analyze the 2008 financial crisis. He sees its roots in the transformation of Western culture via globalization. Since each civilization is characterized by a religion, the question is what is a religion of global civilization? Christianity (of Western and Eastern)? No. Rather business is its "religion", a secular one. It implies that business values (profit maximization and social responsibility minimization) dominate the mind set of the World Elite. Hence, the market economy expands into market society and everything is for sale. The wisdom approach says that what was once wise (ex. in the 19th century) does not have to be wise today (21st century). The Keynes stimulation of the market worked well in the closed economy in the 1930s–40s. It does not work in the 2010s when the economy is open (globalization). The market economy worked after the World War II but today is controlled more by lobbyists than by the "invisible hand". Furthermore, just common sense wisdom tells us that a large country's service economy cannot grow, since is based upon weak income and low demand. The same level of wisdom shows that businesses are not created by the billionaires but by the customers with disposable income. The success of small and medium business (SMB) depends on big business' cooperation. These kind of issues he and Edward Jayne put in the paper "The Business Religion of Global Civilization." (Dialogue and Universalism, vol. XX, no. 9–10, 2010, pp. 95–112). Also, Targowski initiated team research on Spirituality and Civilization Sustainability in the 21st Century. The results of this research should be published in 2013.

== Service systems and automation laws ==
Since the Western-West (Atlantic) civilization is in decline in the 21st century, some political leaders suggest recovery from that state by emphasizing more innovations by business. One forgets that more innovations in service economies lead to higher unemployment. Hence, Targowski (influenced by Isaac Asimov's laws of robotics) defined Laws of service [in his book (2009:273)]:

- Law I – Do not develop service systems without human presence.
- Law II – Do not develop service systems which harm society.
- Law III-Do not develop service systems which endanger human race.

Another political suggestion indicates that Western Civilization is going to regain manufacturing from China but it will be functioning in "dark factories." Targowski with Vladimir Modrák developed the following Laws of Automation:

- Law I. Do not implement high automation technology before you are sure that same goal can be achieved by another means.
- Law II. Do not implement automation technology with the aim to totally eliminate human presence in manufacturing process.
- Law III. Do not develop automation which harms society or endangers the human race.

To integrate all these laws into one coherent discipline, a new one should be pursued. Perhaps it should be named Technosophie, which should investigate wise engineering for wise civilization. This kind of engineering should be only developed today and aimed at the sustainability of our civilization in times of shrinking strategic resources of the planet. It is widely known that population becomes too big to sustain our western styles of life, even in a short-term future. Hence, the future is now and Technosophie is needed today as never before. Targowski and Modrák presented their laws in a paper "Is Advance Automation Consistent with Sustainable Economic Growth in Developed World? at the International Conference CENTERIS-2011 in Vilamoura, Portugal, October 5–7, 2011 and published it in the Proceedings ENTERprise Information Systems Part I:63–72, published by Springer, 2011.

== Other works ==
=== Psychology ===
Targowski used his cognitive informatics approach and "connected" life's purpose: happiness and wisdom. His purpose was to define an approach to include wisdom, awareness of life's purpose, and happiness into constructs of resilience and resourcefulness of the human system. He found that wisdom (in the civilization context), the purposes of life, and happiness must be recognized as indispensable attributes of human existence and nature, and they represent necessary resources that enhance resilience to all kinds of challenges. He offered a method how to test these traits investigated by psychologists. In summary, he also found that human wise (positive) life usually is accomplished through self-realization or self-creation within boundaries and degrees of happiness which depends on knowing a given life's purposes (or fulfilling social roles) and on means leading to them. The former are subject to the development of one's capacities and aspirations as human potential for pleasing, shaped by social interaction. In the Western Civilization of the 21st century, a person's felicity implies liberty and freedom of choice. Targowski published this approach in a chapter "Wisdom, Awareness of Life's Purpose, and Happiness: the Cognitive Approach in Celinski & Grow's book (2011).

=== Health care ===
Health care policy became a very hot issue during Barack Obama's presidency. The health care business is the largest business in the U.S. (about 15% of GDP, $2.2 trillion in 2012) and is characterized by the constant rise of its costs and about 50 million citizens (16% of the population) who do not have any health insurance. One of the factors contributing to such a high cost is a high cost of processing data in this service. Targowski as a computer scientists and then a director of the Center for Sustainable Business Practices (2009–2012) at the Haworth College of Business at WMU organized a regional conference on "Health Care Crisis and Hope" at the Fetzer Center (WMU), September 25, 2010. He found that the main problem is not with "data" but with a lack of a defined role of the national health care in the society. He offered the following principles of the American health care services:

- 1. The basic laws of the U.S. should be the foundation for the concept of health care:
  - The United States Declaration of Independence (1776) states that "We hold these truths to be self-evident, that all men are created equal, that they are endowed by their Creator with certain unalienable Rights, that among these are Life, Liberty and the pursuit of happiness.
  - The United States Constitution (1787) is also the base for the concept of health care. In the Constitution's preamble is stated: “We the People of the United States, in order to form a more perfect union, establish justice, insure domestic tranquility, provide for the common defense, promote the general welfare, and secure the blessings of liberty to ourselves and our posterity, do ordain and establish this Constitution for the United States of America.”
  - The concept of “Happiness” and “Welfare” in the 18th century were slightly different from today. We can assume that both terms currently mean "Well-Being of Americans." This value is a constitutional opportunity of an American. Well-being is a very time and process-oriented value that cannot be guaranteed forever. Once accomplished, it can be lost to many internal and external factors. On the other hand, the United States Constitution supports this value by providing tools that help in pursuing this opportunity.
- 2. Good health of Americans is a constituent of their well-being. In other words, good well-being is usually determinant of good health. Without good well-being, Americans may not have good health.
- 3. Good health care is a constitutional opportunity of Americans. Today health care is very expensive. If it is free, it certainly will not satisfy the high expectations of Americans. Do they often perceive death as an option? The choice is between the right and privilege of having health care. It depends on the state's economic situation and societal and political support. In this respect today, Americans are divided almost equally between the right and privilege. Due to almost 16 percent of the population not having health insurance (50 million) and high inequality (for 2000, 40.8% are below perfect distribution, according to the Gini coefficient, comparable to Morocco's and in contrast to Norway's 25.8% in 2000 (2007 World Development Indicators, World Bank, pp. 67 –68), in times when 10 percent are unemployed and another 5 percent is out of statistics, to have a privilege of health care may lead to a lack of social tranquility which is expected by the U.S. Constitution. Therefore, basic health care should be perceived as the controlled right. It means that certain medical help is secured but its use is controlled and if it is abused by unwise life styles, it can be suspended.
- 4. Well-being of Americans means an equal access to sustainable economic vitality with minimized inequality, based upon a sustainable environment which delivers healthy food, fresh water and air, and culture-oriented activities.
- 5. Well-being of Americans is achievable through human and societal wisdom, meaning prudent choices made in economic, cultural, and technology-oriented processes.
  - In particular, political wisdom is very important, since it leads the whole regions and nation.
  - Human and societal wisdom requires mentally healthy people.
  - Human and societal wisdom requires well educated citizens.
- 6. Good health is possible if the Americans' life styles are wise and good.

He also designed the Architecture of National Health Information Exchange Network for the U.S. Targowski published his solution in a paper Well-Being, Wisdom, and Health, From the Big-picture to the Small Picture," in Targowski & Ruoff's book (2010). For this effort Targowski received a letter from Vice President Joe Biden.

=== Multiculturalism ===
Targowski as an immigrant feels very well the issue of multiculturalism. In 1974-1975 when he was a visiting professor at Hamilton College (Clinton, New York), the American Catholic Hierarchy did not allow mass in Polish since the goal was to integrate immigrants within the American society. In the 2000s a concept of multiculturalism was evolving with the popularity of hyphenated Americans (Polish-American, Mexican-American and so forth). In Western Europe, multiculturalism even evolved in many civic unrests, particularly in France. Steadily, the American nation has been transforming into the American political society, with the tendency to protect specific groups' interest. Therefore, Targowski undertook research on multiculturalism and among several solutions defined, he emphasized the importance of the role of the middle culture. This culture means – the full assimilation of immigrants, but particularly in the first generation is difficult. Therefore, to minimize their isolationist tendencies, one must require that these individuals accept the given state's culture, which is referred as the middle culture. This kind of culture includes awareness and skills of a state citizen:

- National values (expressed in the Constitution),
- National symbols (expressed, for example, in the pride of a national flag and military service),
- Official language as a mean of communication out of the original culture,
- Intercultural communication – skills to communicate with another culture,
- Cross-cultural communication – skills to communicate with many cultures,
- Other

It does not mean that an immigrant must follow rules of the middle culture only. In certain situations the immigrant should follows rules of three or more cultures. At home perhaps Polish culture can be practiced, at work the middle culture (American) should be obeyed, in a university class room perhaps Global culture should rule. If spouses come from different cultures/civilizations, behavior can be ruled by four or more cultures. Of course life in such environment is not easy. He published his findings in a paper "The Clash of Peoples in Civilizations with the Comparative Modeling Perspective." in Comparative Civilizations Reviews, Spring 2012, pp. 56–74. Those who have problems with immigration, he offers his personal approach "he loves Poland as his Mother, he loves the U.S. as his Wife." Both "loves" are based upon loyalty, but of different kind.

== Hobbies ==
In his youth in communistic Poland, Targowski avoided any involvement in communistic youth associations. However, the regime was clever and allowed young people to dance American rock and roll in in-door places to avoid any unrest at the streets. He applied this policy with good energy, but his main interest was in sport. He was Warsaw's representative in junior skiing. However, since Warsaw is located on a flat terrain, he could not compete successfully with those skiers, from the mountain regions, where they could ski every day. Therefore, he switched to ping-pong and tennis. In the 1950s he was junior champion of Warsaw in single and doubles (with Andre Lech). In 1979 he was an international champion of Poland in doubles (with Andre Lech) (Sopot). When Gomułka's hard hand regime fell in December 1970, he was asked by tennis players to be a candidate for president of the Polish Tennis Association. He was elected (1971–1972), but after conducting 32 meetings/year, each a few hours, he resigned, since he stopped playing tennis and could not carry his job at the national information technology office. In the U.S. he is a club player. In 2003 he won the championship of Michigan and Midwest (Indianapolis) and fifth place in the Nationals (Scottsdale, Arizona) in super senior category, team doubles (he used to play double No. 1 with Ken Donner). In the 1990s–2000s he won three times the Irish Open Tournament (regional) in doubles. Now he plays No. 3, when he was just a runner up of Michigan in 2011. He plays at West Hill Athletic Club in Kalamazoo. Needless to say that in his tennis city there are boys nationals, organized for the last 70 years.

== Selected works ==
=== Information technology ===
==== Books ====
- Informatyka klucz do dobrobytu, (Informatics a Key to Prosperity).(1971). Warsaw: PIW, – Polish bestseller.
- Organizacja ośrodków obliczeniowych, (Organization of Computer Centers). (1971). Warsaw: PWŁ.
- Informatyka modele rozwoju i systemów, (Informatics, Models of Development & Systems). (1980). Warsaw: PWE.
- The Architecture and Planning of Enterprise-wide Information Management Systems, Map of the Enterprise. (1990). Harrisburg, Pennsylvania.: Idea Group Publishing. ISBN 1-878289-02-0.
- Strategia i architektura systemów informatycznych przedsiębiorstwa w gospodarce rynkowej, (Strategy and Architecture of Information Systems in a Market Economy). (1992). Warszawa: Nowe Wydawnictwo Polskie. ISBN 83-85135-51-0.
- GII: Global Information Infrastructure. (1996). Harrisburg, Pennsylvania.: Information Science Publishing. ISBN 1-59904-349-1.
- Enterprise Information Infrastructure. (1999). New York: Simon & Schuster, ISBN 0-536-62687-1
- Informatyka bez złudzeń – wspomnienia, (Informatics without Illusions. Memoirs). (2001). Toruń, Poland: Wydawnictwo Adam Marszalek, ISBN 83-7174-795-0.
- Electronic Enterprise, Strategy and Architecture. (2003). Harrisburg, Pennsylvania. & London: IRM Press, ISBN 1-931777-77-2.
- A. Targowski & T. Rienzo. (2002). Enterprise Information Infrastructure, Kalamazoo, Michigan.: Paradox Associates, ISBN 0-9722483-0-7.
- A. Targowski & T. Rienzo. (2004). Enterprise Information Infrastructure, Kalamazoo, Michigan.: Paradox Associates, ISBN 0-9722483-1-5.
- A. Targowski & M. Tarn. (2006). Enterprise Systems Education in the 21st Century. Harrisburg, Pennsylvania.: Information Science Publishing, ISBN 1-59904-349-1.
- A.Targowski (2013).Historia, Terazniejszość, Przyszlość INFORMATYKI (History, Present, Future of INFORMATICS). Łòdź: WYDAWNICTWO POLITECHNIKI ŁÒDZKIEJ, ISBN 978-83-7283-535-2.
- A. Targowski (2014). The Deadly Effect of Informatics on the Holocaust. Mustang, Oklahoma: Tate Publishing, ISBN 978-1-63185-381-4.
- A.Targowski (2016). The History, Present State, and Future of Information Technology. Santa Rosa, California: Informing Science Press, ISBN 978-1-68110-002-9.
- A.Targowski (2016). Informing and Civilization. Santa Rosa, California: Informing Science Press, ISBN 978-1-68110-006-7.

==== Book chapters ====
- Targowski, A. and A. Metwalli. (2002). "The Framework for Cross-culture Communication Process Efficiency and Cost in the Global Economy." In ed. E. Szewczak and C. Snodgrass. Managing the Human Side of Information Technology: Challenges and Solutions, Harrisburg, PA: Idea Group Publishing. ISBN 1-930708-32-7.
- Targowski, A. (2002). "The Information Laws." In D. White, Ed.Knowledge Mapping & Management. Harrisburg, PA: IRM Press. ISBN 1-931777-17-9.
- Targowski, A. (2003). "Info-Mathics-The Mathematical Modeling of Information." In L.Favre, Ed. UML and the Unified Process. Harrisburg, PA: IRM Press. ISBN 1-931777-44-6.
- Targowski, A. (2005). "The Taxonomy of Information Societies." In Yi-chen Lan, ED. Global Information Society. Hershey, PA: Idea Group Publishing. ISBN 159140307-3.
- Targowski, A. (2007). "The genesis, Political, and Economic Side of the Internet." In L. Tomei, Ed. Integrating Information & Communications Technologies into the Classroom. Hershey, PA: Information Science Publishing. ISBN 1-59904259-2.
- Targowski, A. (2008). "The genesis, Political, and Economic Side of the Internet." In Van Slyke, Craig, Ed. Information Communication Technologies: Concepts, Methodologies, Tools and Applications. Hershey, PA: Information Science Reference.
- Targowski, A. (2009). “The Evolution From Data To Wisdom In Decision-Making at the Level of Real and Virtual Networks. In C. Camission et al. Eds. Connectivity and Knowledge Management in Virtual Organizations: Networking and Developing Interactive Communications. Hershey, PA & London: IGI. ISBN 978-160566070-7.
- Targowski. A. (2010). "The Enterprise System Approach." In M.M. Cruz-Cunha, Ed. Social, Managerial, and Organizational Dimensions of Enterprise Information Systems. Hershey & New York: Business Science Reference. ISBN 978-1-60566-856-7.
- Targowski, A. (2011). "A Role of Social Networking in Civilizational Development, Towards Better Communication and Reasoning in Global Virtual Nation and Virtual Nation." In M.M. Cruz-Cunha & G. Putnik. Eds. Business Social Networking: Organizational, Managerial, and Technological Dimensions. Hershey & New York: Business Science Reference.

=== Civilization ===
- Targowski, A. (2009).Information Technology and Societal Development, Hershey, PA & New York, Information Science Reference, ISBN 1-60566-005-1.
- Targowski, A. & T. Rienzo. Eds. (2010). Newspapers in Crisis. Kalamazoo, MI: Civilization Press. ISBN 978-0-9819330-5-4.
- Targowski, A. (2012). Ewolucja techniki i związane z nią nadzieje w społeczeństwie XXI wieku – podejście cywilizacyjne. (Evolution of Technique and Associated with It Expectations in the Society of the 21st Century, the Civilization Approach). In Zacher, L. Ed. Nauka, Technika, Społeczeństwo. (Science, Technique, and Society). Warsaw: Wydawnictwo poltex. ISBN 978-83-7561-163-2.
- Targowski, A & Marek J. Celinski. Eds. (2013). Spirituality and Civilization Sustainability in the 21st Century. Nova Science Publishers, 2013, ISBN 978-1-62618-587-6.
- Targowski, A. (2014). Global Civilization in the 21st Century. Nova Science Publishers, 2014, ISBN 978-1-63117-609-8.
- Targowski, A & B. Han. Eds. (2014). Chinese Civilization in the 21st Century. Nova Science Publishers, 2014, ISBN 978-1-63321-960-1.
- Targowski, A. (2015). Virtual Civilization in the 21st Century. Nova Science Publishers, ISBN 978-1-63463-261-4.
- Targowski, A. (2015). The Limits of Civilization. Nova Science Publishers, ISBN 978-1-63463-423-6.
- Isaac, T. & A. Targowski. Eds. (2015). African Civilization in the 21st Century. Nova Science Publishers, ISBN 978-1-63463-636-0.
- Targowski, A. (2015). Western Civilization in the 21st Century. NOVA Science Publishers, ISBN 978-1-63482-302-9.
- Targowski, A & Abe, J & Kato, H. Eds. (2016). Japanese Civilization in the 21st Century.NOVA Science Publishers, ISBN 978-1634855983, ISBN 1634855981.

=== Wisdom ===
- Cognitive Informatics and Wisdom Development, Hershey, Pennsylvania. & New York, Information Science Reference, 2011, ISBN 978-1-60960-168-3
- WISDOM. Kalamazoo, Michigan.: Civilization Press, ISBN 978-0-9835126-6-0.
- Harnessing the Power of Wisdom, New York: Nova Science Publishers, 2013, ISBN 978-1-62618-890-7.
- Il potere della saggezza, Amazon Kindle edition, 2016. ASIN: B01LZA7GXD.

=== Health care ===
- A.Targowski & G. Ruoff. Eds. (2010).Health Care, Crisis and Hope. Kalamazoo, Michigan.: Civilization Press, ISBN 978-0-9819330-8-5.

=== Psychology ===
- Targowski, A. (2010). "Wisdom, Awareness of Life's Purpose, and Happiness as Means of Resilience and Resourcefulness of Human System: The Cognitive Informatics Approach.” In Eds. M Celinski and K. Gove. Continuity versus Creative Response to Challenge; the Primacy of Resilience and Resourcefulness in Life and Therapy. Hauppauge, NY: NOVA SCIENCE PUBLISHERS, INC. ISBN 978-1-61209-718-3.

=== Politics ===
- Red Fasicm, Lawrenceville, (1982). Lawrenceville, VA: Brunshwick Publishing Co., ISBN 0-931494-23-0
- Chwilowy koniec historii, (Temporary End of History). (1991). Warszawa: Nowe Polskie Wydawnictwo, ISBN 83-85135-30-8.
- Dogoniċ czas, (In the Pursuit of Time). (1993). Warszawa: Bellona, 1993, ISBN 83-11-08245-6.
- Obrona Polski, dziś i jutro, (Defense of Poland, Today & Tomorrow). (1993). Warsaw: Bellona, ISBN 83-11-08280-4 – Editor.
- Wizja Polski, (Vision of Poland). (1995, 1997). Warsaw: Cinderella Books, ISBN 83-86245-30-1, 2000 ISBN 83-86245-87-5 – Editor.
- Losy Polski i Ŝwiata, (The Faith of Poland and the World). (2000). Warsaw: Bellona, 2000, ISBN 83-11-09094-7 – Editor.
- Obserwacje z USA, (Observations from America). (2003). Warsaw: Cinderella Books, ISBN 978-83-7339-030-0
- Spojrzenie z USA na Polskę, świat i nie tylko (cz. 1), (A Look upon Poland, the World and Beyond). (2009). Warsaw: Biblioteka Nowego Kuriera, ISBN 978-83-929067-0-4.
- Spojrzenie z USA na Polskę, świat i nie tylko (cz. 2), (A Look upon Poland, the World and Beyond). (2009). Warsaw: Biblioteka Nowego Kuriera, ISBN 978-83-929067-4-2.
