= NII Awards =

National Information Infrastructure Awards
- Country: United States of America
- Presented by: Access Media Inc. / Ziff-Davis
- First award: 1995

The NII Awards was an awards program designed to recognize excellence and innovation in use of the Internet. The National Information Infrastructure Awards, later known as the Global Information Infrastructure (GII) Awards, were given from 1995 though 1999.

== History ==
The NII Awards were created in 1995 by Access Media Inc. (based in Santa Monica, California), with James Hake as chairman. By 1999 Melanie McMullen was General Manager of the GII Awards. The Awards were supported by more than 70 corporate, media, government and public sponsors. Businesses, community organizations, government agencies and individuals were all eligible to submit entries to the competition. Winners of the GII Awards include Yahoo!, The Schwab WebSite/Charles Schwab & Co., ThinkQuest and The Wall Street Journal Interactive Edition.

In 1996 Vice President Al Gore was quoted in a press release: "The winners of the NII Awards represent real-life benefits delivered through the NII and give us an encouraging look at what is possible in the future. These examples help all Americans understand the promise and potential of the information superhighway."

=== First annual awards (1995) ===
- Arts & Entertainment: HotWired online magazine, a vibrant, interactive magazine in cyberspace with over 200,000 readers.
- Business: National Materials Exchange Network, which facilitates more than 5,000 businesses recycling waste materials.
- Community: Alzheimer's' Disease Support Center (on Cleveland Free-Net), for its bulletin board system that provides a 24-hour electronic support community for the families of Alzheimer's' victims.
- Education: DO-IT Program (Disabilities, Opportunities, Internetworking, Technology), for its use of the Internet to provide distance learning and mentoring to high school students with disabilities. Global SchoolNet was recognized for pioneering content-driven collaboration in schools worldwide.
- Government: Utah Library Network Initiative, for its work to give rural library users access into national data bases such as the Library of Congress.
- Health: Information Network for Public Health Officials, for a project to allow public health officials to track outbreaks of infectious diseases.

The 1995 NII Awards attracted more than 550 entries and 180 judges. Entries were submitted from February to May, and the winners were announced on July 12, 1995. The Awards were presented in Washington, D.C. at a dinner emceed by talk show personality Dick Cavett.

=== Second annual awards (1996) ===
- Arts & Entertainment: Cityspace: Network Social Space of the Future, San Francisco
- Business: The Wall Street Journal Interactive Edition. Its easy, newspaper-like structure provides markets coverage as well as news in business, technology, marketing, the law, sports and weather.
- Children: Faces of Adoption: America's Waiting Children, The National Adoption Center, Philadelphia, PA
- Community:Charlotte's Web: Building Communities of Hope, Charlotte, North Carolina
- Education: Winner - The Jason VII Project, Undersea Internet Site, The Jason Foundation for Education, EDS https://ic.media.mit.edu/projects/JBW/NIIPressRelease.html
- Government: NFS Fastlane Project, National Science Foundation, Washington, D.C.
- Health: Visiting Nurse Service of New York (VNSNY), for a clinical information system based on FPSI's pen tablet computer that is designed to improve information flow between doctors, clinics and field nurses who visit patients in the home.
- Next Generation (Special Award): Starbright World (Starlight Children's Foundation), a broadband network that links hospitals and allows seriously ill children to learn, play, and make friends on a virtual playground.
- Public Access (Special Award): EPA.net - East Palo Alto Gets Plugged In, Pluggedin.org
- Telecollaboration (Special Award): Electronic Cafe International, for their global network of public venues, or computerized cafes, dedicated to telecollaboration between people in cyberspace.

The 1996 NII Awards attracted more than 850 entries and 200 judges. From 60 finalists, the winners' Awards were presented on December 3, 1996, in New York City at the Hilton Towers https://ic.media.mit.edu/projects/JBW/NIIPressRelease.html

=== Third annual awards (1997/98) ===
By 1997 the name was changed to Global Information Infrastructure (GII) Award, although entries were required to be in English, and based principally in the United States.

- Arts & Entertainment: Dia Center for the Arts, for its unique program of large-scale web-based artists' projects.
- Children: Getting Real/Kidsites3000
- Commerce: Charles Schwab & Co., for its use of online brokerage services to empower 1.2 million online customers who engage in $1 billion in transactions through the Schwab Web site every day.
- Community:
- Education: ThinkQuest, for pioneering a new model of collaborative teaching and learning by awarding scholarships to teams of secondary school students who build educational Web sites and tools.
- Entertainment:
- Government: Indianapolis
- Health:
- Netpreneur:
- GII Next Generation:
- Promise:
- Public Access:

The deadline for entries was originally July 7 - August 27, 1997, but was extended to November 24, 1997. From over 800 entries from 41 states, an average of 31 semi-finalists advanced in each of the eleven categories, with 68 entries announced as Finalists on March 6, 1998. Recipients of the 1997 GII Awards were expected be announced at the annual GII Awards Ceremony scheduled for December 2, or in the spring of 1998, in New York City. In fact, winners presentations were held during the Comdex show in Chicago, on April 20, 1998, in the Grand Ballroom at the Chicago Hilton and Towers, emceed by Gene Siskel and Roger Ebert.

=== Fourth annual awards (1999) ===
- Arts & Culture: College of Computing (Georgia Institute of Technology), for The Turing Game (created by Amy Bruckman & Josh Berman), which examined the differences in male and female online communication and interaction.
- Children: MaMaMedia, Inc., for helping kids become lifelong learners.
- Commerce: E*Trade Group, for helping to create a revolution in the financial services industry.
- Community: Join Online (Boston University School of Public Health), for reducing substance abuse and gun violence.
- Education: The Library of Congress, for the National Digital Library Program, providing unique, high quality educational content for Internet users throughout the nation and the world.
- Entertainment: As If Productions, For Comedy Central's World of South Park, creating a popular online counterpart of the animated television show.
- Government: Office of Information Resources Management, Enterprise Information Management Division, U.S. Environmental Protection Agency, for empowering citizens through its Environfacts Warehouse and other applications.
- Health: BabyCenter, for helping new and expectant parents.
- Netpreneur: Garden.com, for creating the definitive Web resource for gardeners.
- News & Media: Firehouse.com (Cygnus Publishing, Inc. & Cool/Writer Internet), for creating a Web Community for the Emergency Services.

More than 500 total entries were received, from which 60 finalists were selected by a panel of 350 judges.

The 1999 Awards were presented at the St. Francis Hotel on December 14, 1999, emceed by comedian Paula Poundstone, in conjunction with Ziff Davis Internet Studios Nextravaganza conference.

=== Demise ===
Although there was an announcement of a fifth set of awards for the year 2000, they were postponed after being spun out from ZD Events to Key3Media. By 2002 the domain name formerly used by the awards was purchased by Global Insight.

== See also ==
- Internet
- World Wide Web
- National Information Infrastructure
