= Harnessing the Power of Wisdom =

2013 book by Andrew Targowski

Harnessing the Power of Wisdom: From Data to Wisdom
- First edition cover
- Author: Andrew Targowski
- Language: English
- Subject: Philosophy
- Publisher: Nova Science Publishers
- Publication date: 2013
- Publication place: United States
- Media type: Print (Hardcover)
- Pages: 169
- ISBN: 978-1-62618-890-7

Harnessing The Power Of Wisdom: From Data to Wisdom is a philosophical book by Andrew Targowski that discusses the concept and status of wisdom in modern society.

== Summary ==
In the book Targowski defines wisdom as good judgement and choice and also states that wisdom can be taught. He goes on to say that wisdom is one portion of the cognitive units that create the Semantic Ladder: Data, Information, Concept, Knowledge, and Wisdom. Targowski also gives his reasons as to why civilization is, as a whole, further behind than it was in Greek times on a philosophical level. He opines that even with the advances in the realm of Information Technology (IT), society remains unable to convert the information at its fingertips into the ultimate form of knowledge and wisdom. This book besides scientific synthesis of wisdom covers also the “art of living” and the decline in human ability to achieve its greatest potential as a global community.

== Reception ==
Biocosmology gave Harnessing the Power of Wisdom a positive review, stating that it was "a remarkable wise contribution to the contemporary cultural world, forming an interdisciplinary theory of wisdom and conception of the wise Integralist civilization. Substantially, this is a significant step towards the integral organization of contemporary social and cultural life, and a valuable piece of information of the integrally organizing essence." Dialogue and Universalism also praised the work and made it one of the main focuses of one of their 2014 issues where they brought in 8 writers to reflect on the work.
