= Globaloria =

American online learning platform

GLOBALORIAeka
- Founded: 2006
- Owner: World Wide Workshop
- Founder: Idit Harel
- Industry: Education Technology
- Website: www.globaloria.com
- Users: 17,500 (in 2015)

Globaloria is an online learning platform oriented to K-12 curricula to teach students to design, prototype, and code educational web/mobile games and simulations with industry-standard technology as a means of learning content and creative innovation skills. Globaloria was developed in 2006 by Idit Harel as a project of the World Wide Workshop Foundation with the stated mission of providing all primary and secondary school students in the U.S. with STEM and computing education opportunities. Globaloria is noteworthy among MOOCs as it is based in constructionist learning theory and Harel's research in the MIT Media Lab.

As of May 2015, Globaloria was being used by over 500 teachers and over 17,000 students in over 50 schools. The product serves participants in 15 states: Alabama, Arizona, California, Florida, Georgia, Illinois, Louisiana, Maryland, New York, Ohio, Oklahoma, Texas, Washington D.C., West Virginia and Wyoming. Globaloria technology and content are designed to cultivate engagement in learning among students on a large scale, and has shown success among schools in rural and urban communities of varied socioeconomic status.

== Courses and Services ==
=== Globaloria Learning Platform ===
Globaloria was developed as a response to a perceived lack of computer science and STEM education opportunities in the United States. Following its stated concept goal of a "scalable, digital game-design learning platform, curriculum, and professional development system that is easily integrated into any school," Globaloria courses each provide a 40- to 100-hour game-design curriculum using industry-standard tools, a customized learning platform with dynamic backend and learning management system, programming and design tutorials, coaching by educators and industry experts, live and digital support systems, and onsite and online educator professional development within a facilitated social community.

Globaloria can be implemented in various formats: as individual courses or a comprehensive cumulative program as part of an existing core curriculum or elective class, or as a stand-alone course activity program such as for after-school programs or camps.

=== Globey Game Design Competition ===
Globaloria students participate annually in a game design competitions called the Globeys, implemented as part of the Globaloria curriculum to enhance the rigorous nature of the program. Certificates, prizes and awards are given to the winning teams of each competition in the spring and summer at Globey Award Ceremonies. Student winners are awarded Game Designer Kits, which include a laptop and programming software. Each winning game is published in the Globaloria Game Gallery, where it is viewable and playable by visitors to the site. Each competition has its own deadlines, prizes, ceremonies and expert judges. Past judges have included executives from Adobe, HP, Microsoft, and Google; professional video game producers; education leaders; and government officials including Senator Jay Rockefeller and former West Virginia Governor Bob Wise.

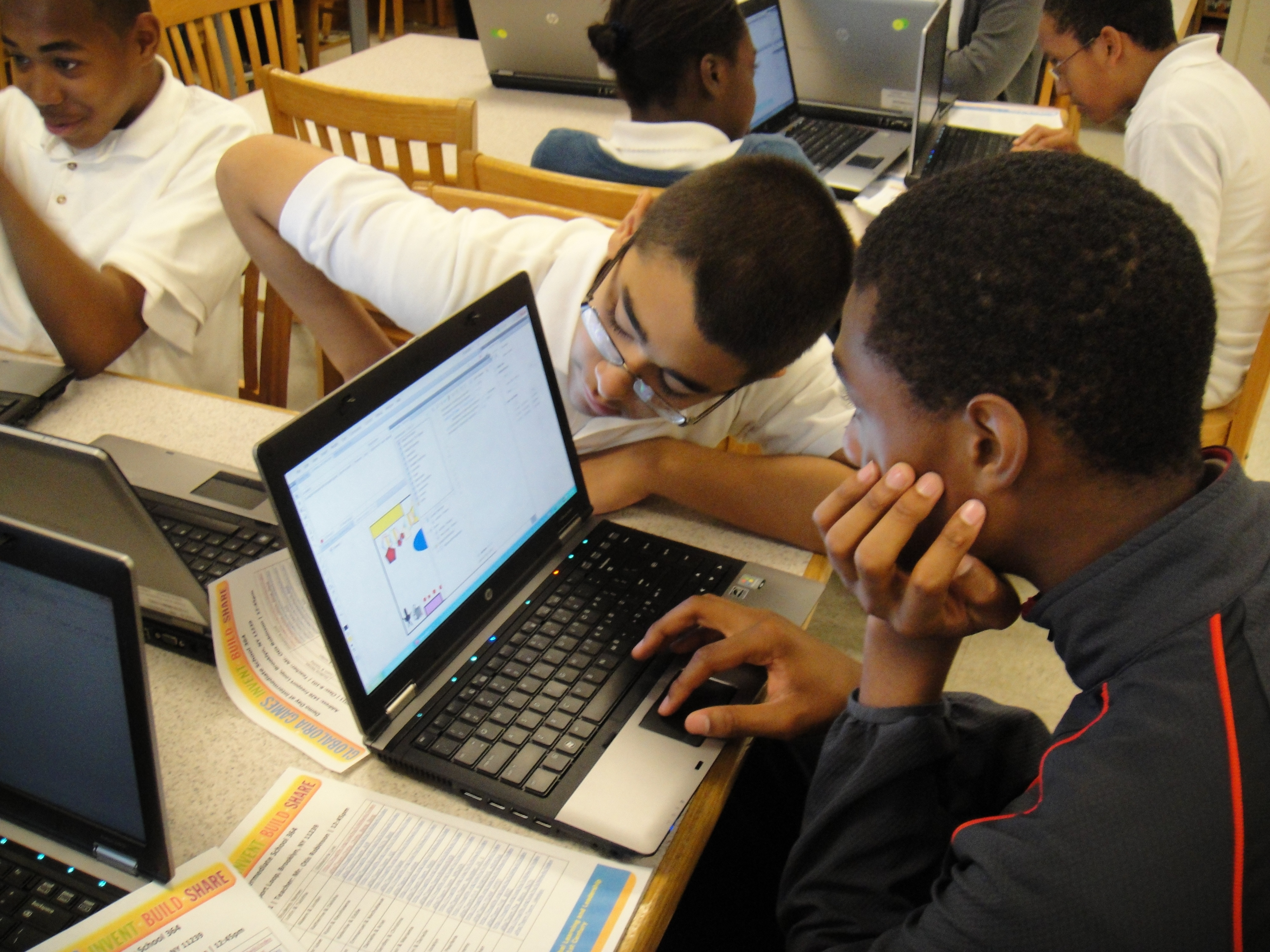
Students working together during Globaloria class.

== Outcomes ==
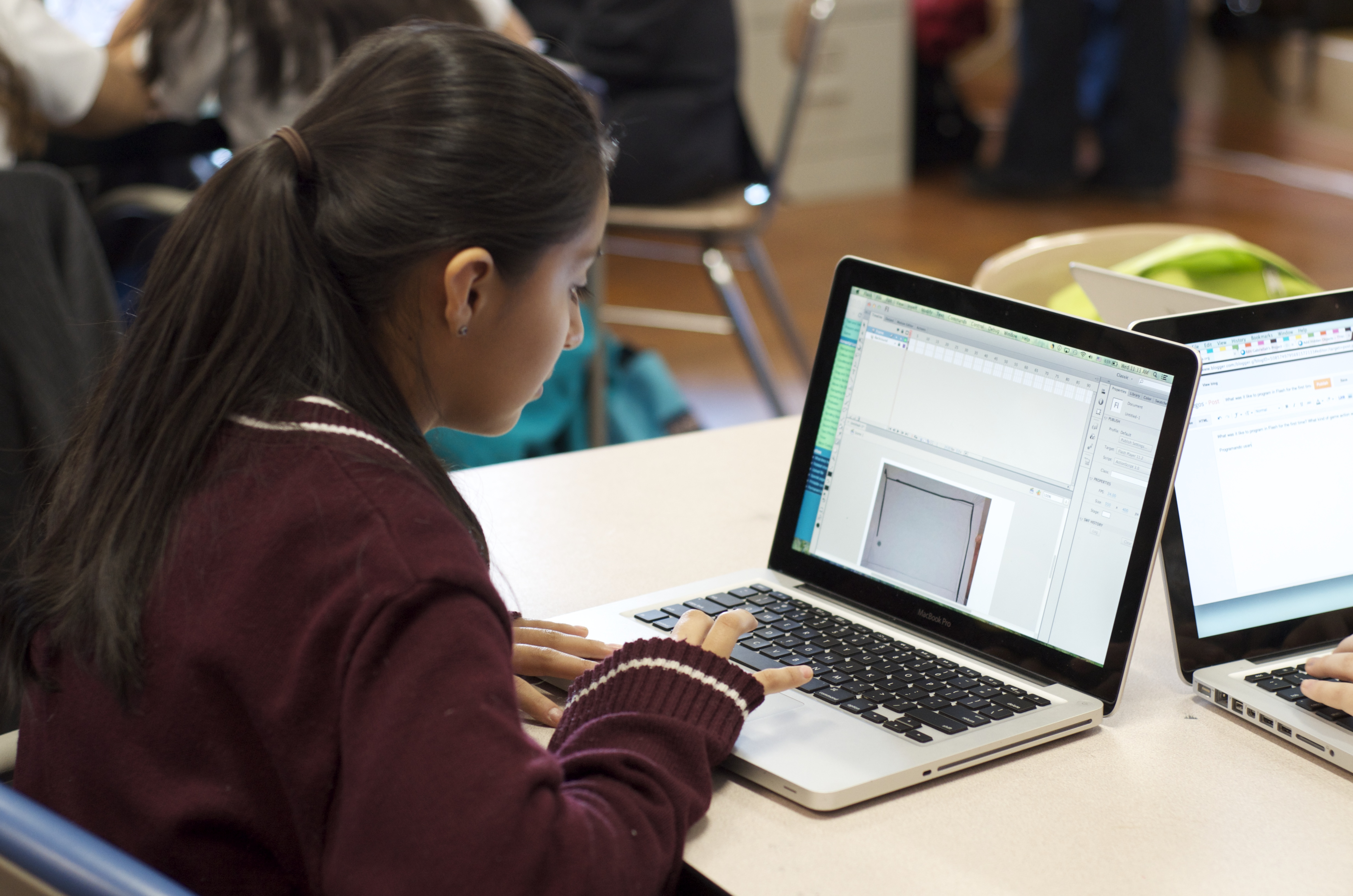
A Globaloria student researches her video game topic using digital resources.

The key outcome of Globaloria courses in any implementation format is that each student successfully learns to take an idea from invention to completion, and to collaborate with peers to design, research, code, program and publish an original educational game. Along the way, students also master global thinking, social media tools such as blogs and wikis, and the skills required to document, chronicle, and co-learn as active members of an online learning community. A profile in Education Week highlighted that Globaloria users develop "the transferable skills of proposal writing, storyboarding, ActionScript software coding, informational blogging, and presentation of progress reports, as students follow a development plan similar to those in the commercial gaming industry through tools available through their account on Globaloria's social learning platform."

Research has shown that Globaloria educates students in technical and computational skills, as well as content knowledge, which results in improved academic performance and increased Constructionist and digital learning abilities, preparing them for college-level studies, digital citizenship, and careers in the global knowledge economy. Additionally, Globaloria has been named by the National Center for Women and Information Technology as a "Promising Practice" for engaging girls in computing, as a result of its success shrinking the digital divide faced by girls and minorities.

== History ==
=== Pilot Platforms ===
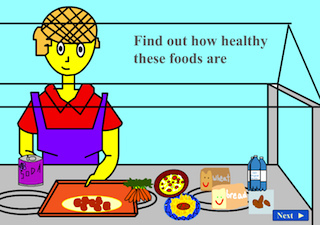
Nutrition-themed game created by a Globaloria MyHLife student

Globaloria was incubated in the World Wide Workshop, beginning in 2006, as a project to combine Harel's research with a blended learning platform for teachers using game design as the core teaching tool. Classes or teams within classes connected to others via an internal social network model. Each community received a wiki-like programmable technology space, used a step-by-step curriculum to learn to design and build a game to be published on the web, and received access to learning content, such as sample games with downloadable codes and custom tutorials. Every participant in the community learned to create a media-rich blog in which to think and reflect regularly on his or her game-making experience and learning process.

Three operational network platforms were tested in the beta version of Globaloria: MyHLife (MyHealthLife), MySLife (MyScienceLife), and MyGLife (My Global Life). Three additional social platforms were developed but not formally launched: MyRLife (MyHumanRightsLife), MyALife (MyArtLife), and MyMLife (MyMathLife).

Globaloria scaled out from the MyGLife platform of World Wide Workshop as an independent enterprise in 2014, its title devised as an amalgamation of "global explorations with media."

=== Globaloria Programs in U.S. Schools ===
West Virginia

After several international pilots of Globaloria during 2006-2007, Governor Joe Manchin and the first lady of West Virginia invited Globaloria to launch a pilot program in Marshall Community and Technical College and seven local secondary schools beginning summer 2007. In partnership with the Governor of West Virginia, Benedum Foundation, Center for Professional Development for the State of West Virginia (CPD), Knight Foundation, and other supporting organizations, the World Wide Workshop implemented a statewide pilot program that brought the Globaloria program into classrooms throughout West Virginia. With a customized curriculum, training, and support programs developed by the World Wide Workshop, Globaloria game and simulation production classes were introduced to seven groups, representing middle schools, high schools, vocational schools and community colleges for grade and credit in June 2007. In its first pilot year, 89 students and 18 educators used the Globaloria-WV program's MyGLife network to design educational web-games. This expanded to 40 secondary schools across West Virginia by 2011, aided by grants from a variety of industry and education sources. The efficacy of the West Virginia program was the subject of longitudinal and case studies by research partners and independent study, which suggest that use of the Globaloria program in schools increases students' knowledge and use of technology, particularly among girls and underserved populations, is linked to gains on standardized tests, and advances both self-directed and collaborative learning in the classroom.

Texas

Since 2009, with funding from the AMD Foundation, Globaloria has been deployed at East Austin College Prep, where every student participates in a daily 60- to 75-minute Globaloria class to develop educational and social-issue games or simulations focusing on original educational and social issue topics. In 2012, Globaloria expanded to neighboring Manor Independent School District, and was also offered as a summer camp in collaboration with Skillpoint Alliance.

California

In 2011, Globaloria launched in Silicon Valley with about 180 youth. The program has grown steadily, reaching 1,500 youth in 2013 with a 100% retention rate among sites.

Florida

In 2011, Globaloria was implemented throughout middle and high schools in the Hillsborough County Public Schools district to enrich the district's formal STEM curriculum.

New York

Globaloria has been active across New York City schools since January 2011, when it partnered with IS 364 Gateway Intermediate School in Brooklyn. This pilot then inspired the program's expansion among The Young Women's Leadership Schools, as well as to a number of the city's iZone schools, including the Bronx Writing Academy, where Globaloria is offered to all 7th grade students. Globaloria workshops were offered at the National Jazz Museum in Harlem in 2011, to teach jazz history and digital literacy to youth through game design. The workshops were a collaboration with jazz artists Jonathan Batiste and his band Stay Human.

Wyoming

Launched in 2013, Globaloria expanded to Wyoming's Sheridan County School District Number 1, where all middle schools offer Globaloria to their 6th and 7th grade students, and the program is being expanded to the high school.

== Awards ==
- The Tech Museum: Tech Awards Microsoft Education Award Laureate (2013)
- Silicon Valley Education Foundation: STEM Innovation Award in Science (2013)
- Software and Information Industry Association: Innovation Incubator Honoree (2013)
- National School Boards Association: Technology Innovation Showcase Honoree (2013)
- Lights. Camera. Help.: Film Festival Finalist (2010) - World Wide Workshop documentary series "Voices from the Field" was selected as finalist in this Austin-based film festival for nonprofit and cause-driven films. "Voices" consisted of 32 video vignettes exploring the learning stories and reflections of young students and their educators who learn and teach with Globaloria.
