= MaMaMedia, Inc. =

Educational consulting firm

Logo for MaMaMedia.com

MaMaMedia was an educational consulting firm run by Idit Harel, specializing in applications of constructionist learning theory.

Founded in 1995, MaMaMedia.com was designed to foster digital literacy skills for children using constructionist theory principles. It was awarded the GII Award for Education in 1999 "for helping kids become life-long learners". The site provided web users with a range of "playful learning" activities and projects.

Between 1996 and 2000, the company developed and grew in the emerging Internet and print marketplaces, publishing the first print magazine for children about the Internet, MaMaMedia: A Kid's Guide to the Net.
