= The Future: Six Drivers of Global Change =

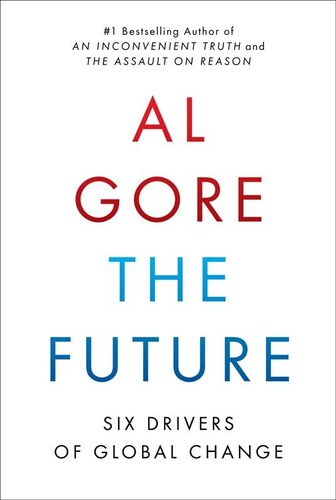
- Book cover
- Author: Al Gore
- Language: English
- Publisher: Random House
- Publication date: January 29, 2013
- Publication place: United States
- Pages: 592
- ISBN: 978-0812992946
- Website: algore.com/library/the-future-six-drivers-of-global-change

The Future: Six Drivers of Global Change is a 2013 book by Al Gore. The six drivers of change described are: "Outgrowth", "The Reinvention of Life and Death", "The Edge", "Earth Inc.", "The Global Mind", and "Power in the Balance". The book covers topics such of climate change, population growth, topsoil depletion, as well as the Internet and global trade.
