= Young Women's Leadership School =

The Young Women's Leadership School (TYWLS) are public secondary schools for grades 6–12 that are operated by Student Leadership Network. TYWLS provide a single-gender educational choice for students who are often the first in their families to attend college.

- Two of the five schools in the Student Leadership Network (formerly Young Women's Leadership Network)
  - Young Women's Leadership School of East Harlem
  - The Young Women's Leadership School of Queens, Queens, New York City
- Affiliate schools of the Young Women's Leadership Network:
  - Ann Richards School for Young Women Leaders, Austin, Texas
  - Baltimore Leadership School for Young Women, Maryland
  - Irma Lerma Rangel Young Women's Leadership School, Dallas, Texas
  - Young Women's College Preparatory Academy, Houston, Texas
  - Young Women's Leadership Charter School of Chicago, Chicago, Illinois
  - The Young Women's Leadership School at Rhodes High School, Philadelphia, Pennsylvania
  - Young Woman's Leadership Academy, Midland, TX

== Other schools ==
- Coretta Scott King Young Women's Leadership Academy, Atlanta, Georgia

== See also ==
- Young Women's Leadership Academy (disambiguation)
