= Information superhighway =

Term used in the 1990s to refer to the Internet

The information superhighway is a late-20th-century descriptive phrase that aspirationally referred to the increasingly mainstream availability of digital communication systems (and ultimately the Internet and its World Wide Web).

To some extent, it is associated with United States Senator and later Vice President Al Gore.

== Definitions ==
There are a number of definitions of this term. The 1996 publication Wired Style: Principles of English Usage in the Digital Age defines the term as "the whole digital enchilada - interactive, cable, broadband, 500-channel [...] then-Senator Al Gore Jr. introduced it at a 1978 meeting of computer industry folk, in homage to his father, Senator Albert Gore Sr."

The McGraw-Hill Computer Desktop Encyclopedia, published in 2001, defines the term as "a proposed high-speed communications system that was touted by the Clinton/Gore administration to enhance education in America in the 21st century. Its purpose was to help all citizens regardless of their income level. The Internet was originally cited as a model for this superhighway; however, with the explosion of the World Wide Web, the Internet became the information superhighway".

The Oxford English Dictionary (OED) defines the term as "a route or network for the high-speed transfer of information; esp. (a) a proposed national fiber-optic network in the United States; (b) the Internet." The OED also cites usage of this term in three periodicals:

- the January 3, 1983 issue of Newsweek: "...information superhighways being built of fiber-optic cable will link Boston, New York, Philadelphia, and Washington, D. C. in a 776-mile system on the East Coast."
- the December 19, 1991 issue of the Christian Science Monitor: "Senator Gore calls NREN the "information superhighway" - a catalyst for what he hopes will become one day a national fiber-optic network."
- the October 26, 1993 issue of the New York Times: "One of the technologies Vice President Al Gore is pushing is the information superhighway, which will link everyone at home or office to everything else—movies and television shows, shopping services, electronic mail and huge collections of data."

The working paper No.179, 1994, of the Center for Coordination Science at Massachusetts Institute of Technology describes the concept as follows: "The information superhighway directly connects millions of people, each both a consumer of information and a potential provider. (...) Most predictions about commercial opportunities on the information superhighway focus on the provision of information products, such as video on demand, and on new sales outlets for physical products, as with home shopping. (...) The information superhighway brings together millions of individuals who could exchange information with one another. Any conception of a traditional market for making beneficial exchanges, such as an agricultural market or trading pit, or any system where individuals respond to posted prices on a computer screen is woefully inadequate for the extremely large number of often complex trades that will be required."

== Earlier similar phrases ==
Some other people used the term "superhighway" in application to telecommunications even earlier.

In 1964, M. Brotherton in his book "Masers and Lasers; How They Work, What They Do" on p. 5, wrote about laser beams and used the term "superhighways" for communication.

The term "electronic super highway" was used by RCA engineer James Hillier in 1971 to describe the future evolution of cable television and home communications

In addition, this cable will run past every bank, school, store, and place of business. It will be an electronic super highway carrying entertainment, education, and informational commerce, making possible a new and closer coupling of the citizen to his society and culture, but from the retained privacy and convenience of his own home.

In 1974, Nam June Paik also used the term "super highway" in application to telecommunications, which gave rise to the mistaken opinion that he may have been the author of the term "information superhighway".

In 1972, Andrzej Targowski presented the Polish National Development Program at the State Council for Informatics, which included the plan of developing the public computer network INFOSTRADA (INFO-STRADA), with autostrada meaning motorway in Polish. Later this plan and its topology were published in his book INFORMATYKA modele rozwoju i systemów (INFORMATICS, models of development and systems)

The building of new electronic super highways will become an even huger enterprise. Assuming we connect New York with Los Angeles by means of an electronic telecommunication network that operates in strong transmission ranges, as well as with continental satellites, wave guides, bundled coaxial cable, and later also via laser beam fiber optics: the expenditure would be about the same as for a Moon landing, except that the benefits in term of by-products would be greater.

== Decline in usage ==
The expression "information superhighway" was widely used in the early and mid-1990s, but it appeared less often in major newspapers by the end of the decade. A review of U.S. press coverage by the media-analysis group Free Press shows a marked drop in references after 1995, as journalists increasingly used terms such as "the Internet" and "the Web".

The technology site Spiegato wrote that the development of the Internet did not match the image of a single, unified "high-speed highway", and pointed to the growth of decentralized, mobile, and wireless networks as a contrast to that metaphor. In The Independent, columnist Miles Kington argued that the metaphor overstated the coherence of the emerging communications system and did not reflect how people were actually connecting online.

The publication Entrepreneur characterized the term as dated by the mid-2000s, advising writers to use more precise language in technical and commercial contexts. A Newsweek piece noted that plans for large-scale fiber-optic deployment in the United States were more expensive and slower than early proponents had projected, reducing the relevance of the "information superhighway" rhetoric in later discussions.

== See also ==
- Al Gore and information technology
- National Information Infrastructure
- The Superhighway Summit
- Internet metaphors
- Knowledge policy
- Cyberspace
- Global village
- HTTP and HTTPS
