= Young Women's Leadership Academy =

Young Women's Leadership Academy (YWLA) may refer to these public all girls' schools in Texas:

- Young Women's Leadership Academy (Fort Worth, Texas), Fort Worth
- Young Women's Leadership Academy at Arnold, Grand Prairie
- Young Women's Leadership Academy (San Antonio, Texas), San Antonio

== See also ==
- Young Women's Leadership School (disambiguation)
